This is a list of notable people from Puerto Rico which includes people who were born in Puerto Rico (Borinquen) and people who are of full or partial Puerto Rican descent. The government of Puerto Rico has been issuing "Certificates of Puerto Rican Citizenship" to anyone born in Puerto Rico or to anyone born outside of Puerto Rico with at least one parent who was born in Puerto Rico since 2007. Also included in the list are some long-term continental American and other residents or immigrants of other ethnic heritages who have made Puerto Rico their home and consider themselves to be Puerto Ricans.

The list is divided into categories and, in some cases, sub-categories, which best describe the field for which the subject is most noted. Some categories such as "Actors, actresses, comedians and directors" are relative since a subject who is a comedian may also be an actor or director. In some cases a subject may be notable in more than one field, such as Luis A. Ferré, who is notable both as a former governor and as an industrialist. However, the custom is to place the subject's name under the category for which the subject is most noted.

Actors, actresses, comedians and directors

A

 Anuel AA (born 1993), musician, rapper, singer
 Kirk Acevedo (born 1971)
 José Miguel Agrelot (a.k.a. "Don Cholito"), comedian
 Jorge Alberti (born 1977), actor
 Trini Alvarado (born 1967), actress
 Robert Avellanet (born 1975), singer, actor, songwriter and producer
 Janet Alvarez Gonzalez (born 1965), actress, writer, director and producer
 Miguel Angel Alvarez (1928–2011), actor and comedian
 La La Anthony (born 1982), actress, MTV VJ
 Amanda Ayala (born 1997), singer
 Marc Anthony (born 1968), singer and actor
 Víctor Argo (1934–2004), actor
 Yancey Arias (born 1971), actor
 Raymond Arrieta (born 1965), comedian and television host
 Miguel Arteta (born 1965), film/television director
 Rick Avilés (1952–1995), actor and comedian
 Charlotte Ayanna (born 1976), actress

B

 Ivonne Belén (born 1955), documentary director and producer
 Rosa Blasi (born 1972), theatrical actress
 Giselle Blondet (born 1966), actress and television host
 Diego Boneta (born 1990), actor, singer-songwriter (Puerto Rican grandfather)
 Lucy Boscana (1915–2001), television and theatrical actress

C
 Paul Calderón (born 1959), actor
 Armando Calvo (1919–1996), actor
 Norma Candal (1930–2006), actress and comedian
 Irene Cara (born 1959), actress and singer
 Awilda Carbia (1938–2009), actress and comedian
 Raulito Carbonell, actor and comedian 
 April Carrión (born 1989), Drag queen, performer, star of RuPaul's Drag Race 
 Braulio Castillo (1933–2015), actor
 Braulio Castillo, hijo (born 1958), actor
 David Castro (born 1996), actor (Puerto Rican father)
 Raquel Castro (born 1994), actress (Puerto Rican father)
 Melwin Cedeño (born 1964), comedian
 Iris Chacón (born 1950), singer and dancer
 Abdiel Colberg (born 1957), film director and television producer
 Ivonne Coll (born 1947), actress
 Míriam Colón (1936–2017), actress and founder of the Puerto Rican Traveling Theatre
 Liza Colón Zayas (born 1972), film and theatrical actress
 Kevin Corrigan (born 1969), actor 
 Luis Antonio Cosme, actor, singer, musician, writer and cook
 Paquito Cordero (1932–2009), comedian and television producer
 Mapita Cortés (1939–2006), actress
 Mapy Cortés (1910–1998), actress
 Auliʻi Cravalho (born 2000), actress and singer
 Mara Croatto (born 1969), actress
 Alexis Cruz (born 1974), actor
 Wilson Cruz (born 1973), actor
 Ismael Cruz Córdova (born 1987), actor
 Monique Gabriela Curnen (born 1970), film and television actress

D

 
 Daddy Yankee (born 1977), musician, rapper, singer, entrepreneur 
 Dagmar (born 1955), actress, singer and television host
Daniel Larze (Filipino-Puerto Rican singer) (born 2005), Puerto Rican singer
 Henry Darrow (1933–2021), actor
 Raúl Dávila (1931–2006), actor
 Rosario Dawson (born 1979), actress
 Blanca de Castejón (1906–1969), actress
 Kamar de los Reyes (born 1967), actor
 Joey Dedio (born 1963), actor, writer, producer
 Idalis DeLeón (born 1969), actress, former MTV VJ, singer (Seduction)
 Benicio del Toro (born 1967), Academy Award-winning actor
 Sylvia del Villard (1928–1990), actress, choreographer and dancer
 Michael DeLorenzo (born 1959), actor
 Nelson Antonio Denis (born 1955), feature film director, screenwriter
 Alba Nydia Díaz (born 1955), actress
 Melonie Díaz (born 1984), actress

E

 Lydia Echevarría (born 1931), actress (convicted for her role in the death of producer Luis Vigoreaux)
 Héctor Elizondo (born 1936), actor
 Erik Estrada (born 1949), actor

F

 Antonio Fargas (born 1946), actor
 José Ferrer (1912–1992), first Hispanic actor to win an Academy Award
 Miguel Ferrer (1955–2017), actor
 Nina Flowers (born 1974), female impersonator and singer, DJ, starred on premiere season of RuPaul's Drag Race and placed in second 
 Luz Odilia Font (1929–2022), actress 
 Cynthia Lee Fontaine (born 1981), drag queen, performer, star of RuPaul's Drag Race

G

 Gloria Garayúa (born 1978), actress
 Aimée García (born 1978), actress
 Mayte García (born 1973), actress, dancer
 Luis Gatica (born 1961), actor
 Marilyn Ghigliotti (born 1961), actress
 Julián Gil (born 1970), television and film actor, model
 Joyce Giraud (born 1975), actress, former Miss Puerto Rico Universe titleholder
 Ian Gómez (born 1964), actor
 Marga Gómez (born 1960), actress, playwright
 Reagan Gómez-Preston (born 1980), actress
 Rick González (born 1979), actor
 Meagan Good (born 1981), actress
 Javier Grillo Marxuach (born 1969), television and film producer
 Luis Guzmán (born 1956), actor
 Luis Roberto Guzmán (born 1973), television and film actor

H
 April Lee Hernández (born 1980), actress
 Juano Hernández (1896–1970), actor
 William Hernández, actor
 Jon Huertas (born 1976), actor. Huertas is best known for his role as witch hunter Brad Alcerro in Sabrina the Teenage Witch
 Lillian Hurst (born 1943), comedian, actress (television series Dharma and Greg)

I
 Ironmouse, VTuber
 Mark Indelicato (born 1994), actor
 Vincent Irizarry (born 1959), actor
 Corinne Irizarry (born 1978), actress/comedian/writer 

J
 Shar Jackson (born 1976), actress/singer (Puerto Rican father)
 Raul Julia (1940–1995), actor
 Victoria Justice (born 1993), singer, television actress (Victorious)  (Puerto Rican mother)
 Jeremy Shada (born 1997), actor and television host
 Jeff Sutphen (born 1977), actor and television host

L
 Eva LaRue (born 1966), actress
 Sunshine Logroño (born 1951), comedian
 Adamari López (born 1978), actress
 Jennifer López (born 1969), singer, actress, and dancer
 Priscilla López (born 1948), actress, singer, and dancer

M

 Justina Machado (born 1972), actress
 Sonia Manzano (born 1950), actress
 Tere Marichal (born 1956), actress, writer, Maria Chuzema
 Eddie Marrero (born 1962), actor, singer
 Ricky Martin (born 1971), singer, actor
 Tony Martínez (1920–2002) actor, singer, and bandleader; remembered for having played Pepino Garcia in The Real McCoys television series
 Alexis Mateo (born 1979), female impersonator, reality television personality
 Claribel Medina (born 1959), actress
 Maritza Medina (born 1967), actress
 Von Marie Mendez, actress and businesswoman
 Jorge Merced (born 1965), theatre actor and director
 Ángela Meyer (born 1947), actress, comedian and producer
 Ari Meyers (born 1969), actress 
 Kenya Michaels (born 1995), former drag queen, current choreographer, performer, dancer, fashion designer, star of season four of RuPaul's Drag Race 
 Lin-Manuel Miranda (born 1980), actor, composer, rapper and writer, best known for creating and starring in the Broadway musicals Hamilton and In the Heights; has won a Pulitzer Prize, two Grammys, an Emmy, a MacArthur "Genius" Award, and three Tony awards
 René Monclova (born 1965), actor and comedian
 Mario Montez (1935–2013), female impersonator; actor; member of Warhol superstars
 Indya Moore (1995), actor and model
 Esaí Morales (born 1962), actor
 Jacobo Morales (born 1934), comedian, director, and actor
 Alicia Moreda (1912–1983), actress, comedian
 Rita Moreno (born 1931), actress, first Hispanic woman to win the following four major awards: an Oscar, a Tony Award, an Emmy Award and a Grammy Award
 Frankie Muñiz (born 1985), actor (Puerto Rican father)
 Tommy Muñiz (1922–2009), television producer, comedian
 Rafo Muñiz (born 1956), comedian and producer

N
 Lymari Nadal (born 1978), actress
 Taylor Negrón (1957–2015), actor/comedian
 Frances Negrón Muntaner (born 1966), filmmaker, writer, and scholar
 Micaela Nevárez (born 1972), actress; first Puerto Rican to win a Goya Award
 Amaury Nolasco (born 1970), actor

O
 Luis Oliva (born 1951), actor, comedian and mime
 Tony Oliver (born 1958), voice actor
 Karen Olivo (born 1976), actress (Puerto Rican father); winner of 2009 Tony Award for Best Featured Actress
 Angel Oquendo, actor 
 Ana Ortiz (born 1971), actress
 Claudette Ortiz (born 1981), singer and model
 Elín Ortiz (1934–2016), actor, television producer
 John Ortiz (born 1968), actor
 Irad Ortiz Jr (born 1992), jockey, three times winner of the Eclipse Award for best jockey in USA (2018,2019,2020)
 Jose Ortiz (born 1993), jockey, 2017 winner of the Eclipse Award for best jockey in USA 
 Ozuna (born 1993), musician, singer, rapper

P
 Marian Pabón (born 1957), actress, singer and comedian
 Antonio Pantojas (1948–2017), drag queen
 Lana Parrilla (born 1977), actress (Puerto Rican father) 
 Rosie Pérez (born 1964), actress
 Joaquin Phoenix (born 1974), actor
 Aubrey Plaza (born 1984), actress
 Freddie Prinze Jr. (born 1976), actor (Puerto Rican grandmother)
 Freddie Prinze (1954–1977), comedian, actor (Puerto Rican mother)

Q 
 Ivy Queen (born 1972), singer, lyricist, rapper, musician, fashion icon; one of the early founders and creators of the reggaeton style 
 Adolfo Quiñones (1955–2020), actor, dancer, choreographer

R

 Anthony Ramos
 Luis Antonio Ramos (born 1973), actor
 Gina Ravera (born 1966), actress
 Carmen Belén Richardson (1930–2012), comedian/actress
 Armando Riesco (born 1977), actor
 Osvaldo Ríos (born 1960), actor and singer
 Chita Rivera (born 1933), actress, singer and dancer; winner of two Tony Awards
 José Rivera (born 1955), playwright; first Puerto Rican nominated for an Oscar in "Best Adapted Screenplay" category
 Luis Antonio Rivera (born 1930), a.k.a. "Yoyo Boing", comedian
 Marquita Rivera (1922–2002), first Puerto Rican actress to appear in a major Hollywood motion picture
 Naya Rivera (1987–2020), actress (Puerto Rican father)
 Ramón Rivero (1909–1956), also known as "Diplo", comedian; organized the world's first known Walk-A-Thon in 1953
 Adalberto Rodríguez (1934–1995), a.k.a. "Machuchal", comedian
 Adam Rodríguez (born 1975), actor
 Freddy Rodríguez (born 1975), actor
 Gina Rodríguez (born 1984), actress
 Gladys Rodríguez (born 1943), comedian, actress
 Jai Rodríguez (born 1979), television personality (Queer Eye for the Straight Guy)
 Michelle Rodriguez (born 1978), actress
 MJ Rodriguez (born 1991), actress and singer
 Ramón Rodríguez (born 1979)
 Marta Romero (1928–2013), actress and singer
 Robi "Draco" Rosa (born 1970), singer
 Johanna Rosaly (born 1948), actress

S

 Zoé Saldaña (born 1978), actress (Puerto Rican mother)
 Olga San Juan (1927–2009), film actress and dancer
 Jaime Sánchez (born 1938), actor (musical West Side Story, film The Wild Bunch)
 Kiele Sánchez (born 1977), actress
 Marcelino Sánchez (1957–1986), actor
 Roselyn Sánchez (born 1973), actress
 Esther Sandoval (1927–2006), actress
 Renoly Santiago (born 1974), actor
 Saundra Santiago (born 1957), actress
 Rubén Santiago-Hudson (born 1956), actor and playwright
 Jon Seda (born 1970), actor
 Jimmy Smits (born 1955), actor (Puerto Rican mother)
 Yara Sofía (born 1984), female impersonator, reality television personality
 Luis F. Soto, director
 Talisa Soto (born 1967), actress, model 
 Miguel Ángel Suárez (1939–2009), actor, playwright, stage director

T
 Rachel Ticotin (born 1958), actress
 Liz Torres (born 1947), actress 
 Myke Towers (born 1994), musician, singer 
 Rose Troche (born 1964), film/television director

U
 Alanna Ubach (born 1975), actress (Puerto Rican mother)

V
 Amirah Vann (born 1978), actress (Puerto Rican mother)
 Joseph Vásquez (1962–1995), film director, screenwriter
 John Velazquez (born 1971), Champion jockey, leading money-earning jockey in the history of horse racing and inducted into Racing Hall of Fame in 2012.
 Nadine Velázquez (born 1978), actress
 Lauren Vélez (born 1964), actress
 Loraine Vélez (born 1964), actress
 Christina Vidal (born 1981), actress and singer
 Lisa Vidal (born 1965), actress
 Juan Emilio Viguié (1891–1966), pioneer movie producer; produced Romance Tropical, the first Puerto Rican film with sound

W
Peggy Walker (born 1942), actress
 Otilio Warrington (born 1944), also known as "Bizcocho", comedian
 Walter Mercado, (born 1932–2019) astrologer, dancer, telenovela actor, writer
 Jessica Wild (born 1980), female impersonator, reality television personality, starred on second season of RuPaul's Drag Race
 Holly Woodlawn (1946–2015), transgender actress and Warhol superstar

Z
 David Zayas (born 1962), actor
 Marcos Zurinaga (born 1952), film director/screenwriter

Adult film entertainers
 Vanessa del Río (born 1952), adult film actress
 Gina Lynn (born 1974), adult film actress
 Mercedes Carrera (born 1982), adult film actress and blogger.

Hosts/presenters
 Paul Bouche, television host, TV producer, A Oscuras Pero Encendidos
 Mairym Monti Carlo (born 1975), television host, chef
 Alfred D. Herger (born 1942), television host, psychologist
 Daisy Martínez, host of PBS cooking show Daisy Cooks!
 John Meléndez (born 1965), once known as "Stuttering John" (Howard Stern Show and The Tonight Show with Jay Leno)
 Rogelio Mills, television host, author and recording artist
 Eddie Miró (born 1936), television host, comedian; hosted El Show de las 12 (The 12 pm Show) for over 40 years
 Silverio Pérez (born 1948), show host, musician and author
 Antonio Sánchez (born 1961), radio and television personality
 Alani Vázquez (born 1981), also known as "La La"; MTV veejay
 Luis Vigoreaux (1928–1983), created ¡Sube, Nene, Sube! (Go up, Man, Go up!) and ¡Pa'rriba, Papi, Pa'rriba! (Higher, Daddy, Higher!)
 Luisito Vigoreaux (born 1951), hosted Sábado en Grande (Big Saturday, also with Roberto), El Show del Mediodía (The Midday Show) and De Magazin
 Roberto Vigoreaux (born 1956), hosted Parejo, Doble y Triple (Square, Double and Triple)

Architects

 Jesús Eduardo Amaral (1927–2020), architect, educator; first director of the School of Architecture at the University of Puerto Rico; Fellow of the American Institute of Architects
 Félix Benítez Rexach (1886–1975), architect and engineer; designed the Normandie Hotel, located in San Juan, Puerto Rico
 Segundo Cardona FAIA (born 1950, San Juan, PR), architect, developer; Fellow of the American Institute of Architects since 2006
 Pedro Adolfo de Castro y Besosa (1895–1936), architect; first Puerto Rican to graduate from an American architecture university; work highlights include Casa de España, Castillo Serrallés
 Toro Ferrer, pioneering Puerto Rican architectural firm led by Osvaldo Toro FAIA and Miguel Ferrer FAIA, both Fellows of the American Institute of Architects and responsible for such landmarks as the Caribe Hilton, the Supreme Court, the Luis Muñoz Marin International Airport and the Hotel La Concha
 Henry Klumb (1905–1984), German-born architect responsible for many Puerto Rico designs from 1944 to 1984; Fellow of the American Institute of Architects
 Andrés Mignucci (born 1957), architect, urbanist; Fellow of the American Institute of Architects; Henry Klumb Award 2012
 Antonio Miró Montilla (born 1937), architect, educator; first architect appointed head of a government agency, the Puerto Rico Public Buildings Authority, 1969 to 1971; first dean of the School of Architecture at the University of Puerto Rico, Río Piedras Campus, 1971 to 1978; Chancellor of the Río Piedras Campus of the University of Puerto Rico, 1978 to 1985
 Antonin Nechodoma (1877–1928), Czech architect working in Puerto Rico and the Dominican Republic at the turn of the 20th century; major works include the Georgetti Mansion, the Casa Korber in Miramar, and Casa Roig in Humacao
 Francisco Porrata-Doria (1890–1971), designed the Ponce Cathedral, Banco de Ponce, and Banco Crédito y Ahorro Ponceño
 Jorge Rigau (born 1953), architect, educator; first dean of the School of Architecture at the Polytechnic University of Puerto Rico; Fellow of the American Institute of Architects
 Blas Silva (1869–1949), creator of the Ponce Creole architectural style; designed, among many others, the Casa de la Masacre, Font-Ubides House, and the Subira House
 Alfredo Wiechers Pieretti (1881–1964), early 20th-century architect from Ponce; designed many historical buildings now listed in the National Register of Historic Places, including his own home (the Wiechers-Villaronga Residence) in the Ponce Historic Zone, which today is home to the Puerto Rico Museum of Architecture

Authors, playwrights and poets
  

A
 Jack Agüeros (1934–2014), author, playwright, poet and translator
 Quiara Alegría Hudes (born 1977), author, playwright; wrote the book for the Broadway musical In the Heights; winner of 2012 Pulitzer Prize for Drama; her play, Elliot, a Soldier's Fugue, was a Pulitzer Prize finalist in 2007 and has been performed around the country and in Romania and Brazil
 Miguel Algarín (1941–2020), poet, writer, co-founder of the Nuyorican Poets Café
 Manuel A. Alonso (1822–1889), poet and author, considered by many to be the first Puerto Rican writer of notable importance
 Francisco Arriví (1915–2007), writer, poet, and playwright; known as "the father of the Puerto Rican theater"
 Rane Arroyo (1954–2010), poet, playwright and scholar

B
 Pura Belpré (1899–1982), author; first Puerto Rican librarian in New York City
 Samuel Beníquez (born 1971), author of the autobiographical book Tu alto precio ... Mi gran valor
 María Bibiana Benítez (1783–1873), playwright, poet
 Alejandrina Benítez de Gautier (1819–1879), poet whose collaboration with the "Aguinaldo Puertorriqueño" (collection of Puerto Rican poetry) gave her recognition as a great poet
 Tomás Blanco (1896–1975), writer and historian;  author of Prontuario Historico de Puerto Rico and El Prejuicio Racial en Puerto Rico (Racial Prejudice in Puerto Rico)
 Juan Boria (1906–1995), Afro-Caribbean poet, also known as the Negro Verse Pharaoh; known for his Afro-Caribbean poetry
 Giannina Braschi, a National Endowment for the Arts Fellow; author of the bestselling Spanglish classic Yo-Yo Boing! and United States of Banana
 Julia de Burgos (1914–1953) was a poet and activist who advocated for Puerto Rican independence. She was a civil rights advocate and a brilliantly intellectual poet. She was an early literary trailblazer for the Nuyorican movement. She defied social norms within her poetry and delved into topics such as the colonial past of her island and the effects of slavery, the imperialist legacy, and feminist ideology.

C
 María Cadilla Colón de Martínez (1884–1951), writer, educator and women's rights activist
 Zenobia Camprubí (1887–1956), writer/poet (Puerto Rican mother); wife of Nobel Prize winning author Juan Ramón Jiménez
 Nemesio Canales (1878–1923), essayist and poet
 Jesús Colón (1901–1974), writer; "father of the Nuyorican Movement"
 Manuel Corchado y Juarbe (1840–1884), poet, journalist and politician; defended the abolition of slavery and the establishment of a University in Puerto Rico
 Juan Antonio Corretjer (1908–1985), poet, journalist and pro-independence political activist (member of the Nationalist Party) who opposed United States rule in Puerto Rico

D
 Nicholas Dante (1941–1991), 'Pulitzer Prize and Tony Award-winning playwright who is best known for the worldwide musical hit A Chorus Line
 José Antonio Dávila (1898–1941), well-known poet during Puerto Rico's postmodern era of poetry
 Virgilio Dávila (1869–1943), poet, considered by many to be one of Puerto Rico's greatest representatives of the modern literary era
 Julia de Burgos (1914–1953), poet
 Eugenio María de Hostos (1839–1903), wrote La Peregrinación de Bayoán, the founding text of Puerto Rican literature (see also "Educators" and "Politicians")
 Caridad de la Luz (born 1977) a.k.a. "La Bruja", poet; writer/actor of Boogie Rican Blvd
 Nelson Denis (born 1955), author, novelist; Editorial Director of El Diario La Prensa; New York State Assemblyman
 Jaquira Díaz, writer, journalist
 Abelardo Díaz Alfaro (1916–1999), writer
 Emilio Díaz Valcárcel (1929–2015), writer
 Sandra María Estéves (born 1948), Nuyorican poet

F
 Héctor Feliciano (born 1952), author; his book The Lost Museum: The Nazi Conspiracy to Steal the World's Greatest Works of Art has shed light on an estimated 20,000 looted works; each one is owned by a museum or a collector somewhere
 Isabel Freire de Matos (1915–2004), writer, educator and advocate of Puerto Rican independence
 Rosario Ferré (1938–2016), writer
 Shaggy Flores (born 1973), Nuyorican writer, poet; African diaspora scholar; founder of Voices for the Voiceless
 Félix Franco Oppenheimer (1912–2004), poet and writer; works include Contornos, Imagen y visión edénica de Puerto Rico, and Antología poética

G
 Magali García Ramis (born 1946), writer
 José Gautier Benítez (1851–1880), leading Puerto Rican poet of the Romantic Era
 José Luis González (1926–1997), one of the most prominent writers of the 20th century, particularly for his El país de cuatro pisos (1980)
 Migene González Wippler (born 1936), new-age author, Santería researcher

H
 Víctor Hernández Cruz (born 1949), poet; in 1969, became the first Hispanic to be published by a mainstream publishing house when Random House published his poem "Snaps;" in 1981, Life Magazine named him one of America's greatest poets
 
L
 Lawrence La Fountain-Stokes, writer; author of Uñas pintadas de azul/Blue Fingernails
 Enrique A. Laguerre (1906–2005), writer; nominated in 1998, for the Nobel Prize in literature
 Tato Laviera (1950–2013), poet; author of AmeRícan
 Eduardo Lalo writer; author of Simone
 Georgina Lázaro (born 1965), children's poet
 Muna Lee (1895–1965), Mississippi-born writer; first wife of Luis Muñoz Marín
 Aurora Levins Morales (born 1954), writer and poet; author of Medicine Stories (1998) and Remedios: Stories of Earth and Iron from the History of Puertorriqueñas (1998)
 Teresita A. Levy, author of The History of Tobacco Cultivation in Puerto Rico, 1898–1940, a study of the tobacco-growing regions in the eastern and western highlands of Puerto Rico from 1898 to 1940
 Luis Lloréns Torres (1876–1944), poet
 Washington Lloréns (1899–1989), journalist, writer, linguist, and scholar
 Luis López Nieves, writer

M
 Hugo Margenat (1933–1957), poet; founder of the political youth pro-independence organizations Acción Juventud Independentista and Federación de Universitarios Pro Independencia
 René Marqués (1919–1979), playwright; wrote La Carreta (The Oxcart), which helped secure his reputation as a leading literary figure in Puerto Rico
 Nemir Matos Cintrón (born 1949), poet, novelist
 Francisco Matos Paoli (1915–2000), poet, critic, and essayist; nominated for the Nobel Prize in literature in 1977; a Secretary General of the Puerto Rican Nationalist Party
 Concha Meléndez (1895–1983), poet, writer
 Manuel Méndez Ballester (1909–2002), writer
 Nancy Mercado (born 1959), poet, playwright; author of It Concerns the Madness, seven theatre plays, and a number of essays; her work has been extensively anthologized
 Pedro Mir (1913–2000), Poet Laureate of the Dominican Republic (Puerto Rican mother)
 Nicholasa Mohr (born 1938), writer; her works, among which is the novel Nilda, tell of growing up in the Bronx and El Barrio and of the difficulties Puerto Rican women face in the United States; in 1973, became the first Hispanic woman in modern times to have her literary works published by the major commercial publishing houses; has had the longest career as a creative writer for these publishing houses of any Hispanic female writer
 Rosario Morales (1930–2011), author; co-author of Getting Home Alive (1986) with her daughter Aurora Levins Morales

N
 Richie Narvaez (born 1965), short story writer and novelist, author of Hipster Death Rattle (2019) and Noiryorican (2020)
 Mercedes Negrón Muñoz (1895–1973), a.k.a. "Clara Lair"; poet whose work dealt with the everyday struggles of the common Puerto Rican

O
 Judith Ortiz Cofer (1952–2016), poet, writer and essayist; in 1994, became the first Hispanic to win the O. Henry Prize for her story "The Latin Deli"; in 1996, she and illustrator Susan Guevara became the first recipients of the Pura Belpre Award for Hispanic children's literature
 Micol Ostow (born 1976), author of Mind Your Manners, Dick and Jane and  Emily Goldberg Learns to Salsa

P
 José Gualberto Padilla (1829–1896) a.k.a. "El Caribe", poet, physician, journalist and politician; advocate for Puerto Rico's independence; was imprisoned for his role in the El Grito de Lares revolt
 Luis Palés Matos (1898–1959), poet of Afro-Caribbean themes
 Antonio S. Pedreira (1899–1939), writer and educator whose most important book was Insularismo, in which he explores the meaning of being Puerto Rican
 Pedro Pietri (1944–2004), poet, playwright; co-founder of the Nuyorican Poets Café
 Miguel Piñero (1946–1988), playwright, writer; co-founder of the Nuyorican Poets Café

R
 Manuel Ramos Otero (1948–1990), writer, poet
 Evaristo Ribera Chevremont (1896–1976), poet
 José Rivera (born 1955), playwright; first Puerto Rican screenwriter to be nominated for an Oscar
 Marie Teresa Ríos (1917–1999), author of the novel The Fifteenth Pelican, which was the basis for the popular 1960s television sitcom The Flying Nun
 Lola Rodríguez de Tió (1843–1924), poet; wrote the lyrics to the revolutionary "La Borinqueña"
 Francisco Rojas Tollinchi (1911–1965), poet, civic leader and journalist

S
 Luis Rafael Sánchez (born 1936), novelist, playwright
 Wilfredo Santa Gómez (born 1949), writer, journalist
 Esmeralda Santiago (born 1948), author
 Mayra Santos Febres (born 1966), poet, novelist
 Pedro Juan Soto (1928–2002), writer/novelist; father of slain independence activist Carlos Soto Arriví
 Clemente Soto Vélez (1905–1993), poet and pro-independence activist (member of the Nationalist Party)

T
 Alejandro Tapia y Rivera (1826–1882), writer and poet; "the father of Puerto Rican literature"
 Piri Thomas (1928–2011), writer, poet whose autobiography Down These Mean Streets was a best-seller
 Edwin Torres (born 1958), Nuyorican Movement poet
 Judge Edwin Torres (born 1931), writer; New York Supreme Court Justice; wrote Carlito's Way
 J. L. Torres (born 1954), writer and poet; wrote The Accidental Native
 Justin Torres (born 1980), writer; wrote We the Animals, also adapted to a film

U
 Luz María Umpierre (born 1947), poet, scholar

V
 Lourdes Vázquez (born 1953), writer and poet
 Edgardo Vega Yunqué (1936–2008), novelist, also known as Ed Vega
 Irene Vilar (born 1969), author and literary agent; granddaughter of independence activist Lolita Lebrón

W
 William Carlos Williams (1883–1963) (Puerto Rican mother), Modernist poet

X
 Emanuel Xavier (born 1971) (Puerto Rican father), poet and author

Z
 Manuel Zeno Gandía (1855–1930), writer; wrote La Charca, the first Puerto Rican novel

Beauty queens and fashion models
  
 Deborah Carthy-Deu (born 1966), Miss Universe 1985
 Susie Castillo (born 1979), Miss USA 2003 (Puerto Rican mother)
 Vanessa De Roide (born 1987), Nuestra Belleza Latina 2012
 Stephanie Del Valle (born 1996), second Puerto Rican Miss World, 2016
 Noris Díaz ("La Taína") (born 1975), model
 Valerie Hernández (born 1993), Miss International 2014
 Stella Díaz (born 1984), fashion model
 Jaslene González (born 1986), fashion model, winner of America's Next Top Model, Cycle 8
 Marisol Malaret (born 1949), first Puerto Rican Miss Universe, 1970
 Marisol Maldonado (born 1970), fashion model
 Melissa Marty (born 1984), Nuestra Belleza Latina 2008
 Wilnelia Merced (born 1957), first Puerto Rican Miss World, 1975
 Astrid Muñoz (born 1974), fashion model
 Cynthia Olavarría (born 1986), Miss Puerto Rico 2005
 Aleyda Ortiz (born 1988), Nuestra Belleza Latina 2014
 Miriam Pabón (born 1985), beauty queen, first contestant in half a century to represent Puerto Rico in the Miss America pageant
 Ada Perkins (1959–1980), Miss Puerto Rico 1978
 Denise Quiñones (born 1980), Miss Universe 2001
 Ingrid Marie Rivera (born 1983), Miss Puerto Rico World  2005
 Zuleyka Rivera (born 1987), Miss Universe 2006
 Chay Santini (born 1976), fashion model
 Laurie Tamara Simpson (born 1968), Miss International 1987
 Joan Smalls (born 1985), fashion model and host of MTV's series House of Style
 Dayanara Torres (born 1974), Miss Universe 1993
 Irma Nydia Vázquez (1929–2019), first Miss Puerto Rico in the Miss America pageant, breaking the color barrier, 1948
 Valeria Vazquez Latorre (born 1994), first Puerto Rican to win the Miss Supranational pageant (2018)

Business people and industrialists

 Carlota Alfaro (born 1933), fashion designer
 Aída Álvarez (born 1950), first Puerto Rican and first Hispanic woman to hold a sub-cabinet-level position in the White House (Small Business Administrator 1997–2000)
 José Berrocal (1957–2000), youngest president of PR Government Development Bank; annual scholarships are awarded in his memory
 Orlando Bravo, co-founder and managing partner of private equity investment firm Thoma Bravo; called "the first Puerto Rican-born billionaire" by Forbes
 Rafael Carrión Sr. (1891–1964), patriarch of one Puerto Rico's financial dynasties; a founding father of Banco Popular de Puerto Rico, the largest bank in Puerto Rico and the largest Hispanic bank in the United States
 Arturo L. Carrión Muñoz (born 1933) – Former executive vice president of the Puerto Rico Bankers Association
 Richard Carrión (born 1952), Chairman of the Board Banco Popular; chairman International Olympic Committee's finance committee
 Kimberly Casiano (born 1957), member of the board of directors of the Ford Motor Company
 Ramiro L. Colón (1904–1983), first administrator of Cooperativa de Cafeteros de Puerto Rico, Café Rico (official coffee of the Vatican)
 Francisco J. Collazo (born 1931), founder of COLSA Corporation, a first-rate provider of engineering and support services in Huntsville, Alabama
 Deirdre Connelly (born 1961), President of North America Pharmaceuticals for GlaxoSmithKline, member of the global Corporate Executive Team and co-chairs the Portfolio Management Board, along with the Chairman of Research and Development.
 Atilano Cordero Badillo (born 1943), founder of Supermercados Grande
 Carmen Ana Culpeper, former SBA Regional Director; first female PR Treasury Secretary and PR Telephone Company President
 Óscar de la Renta (1932–2014), fashion designer (Puerto Rican father from Cabo Rojo, Puerto Rico)
 Fernando Fernández (1850–1940), founder of Ron del Barrilito and Alcoholado Santa Ana
 José Ramón Fernández (1808–1883), "Marqués de La Esperanza", the wealthiest sugar baron in Puerto Rico in the 19th century; considered one of the most powerful men of the entire Spanish Caribbean
 Antonio Luis Ferré, owner of the Ferré-Rangel media emporium
 Jaime Fonalledas (born 1946), President and CEO of Empresas Fonalledas, which owns Plaza Las Américas, the largest shopping mall in the Caribbean and one of the top retail and entertainment venues in the world; Fonalledas' companies include Plaza Del Caribe, Tres Monjitas, Vaqueria Tres Monjitas, Ganaderia Tres Monjitas, and franchise Soft & Creamy
 José Juan García (1940–2002), founder of Hogares Crea
 Eduardo Georgetti (1866–1937), agriculturist, businessman, philanthropist, politician and sugar baron
 Victoria Hernández (1897–1998), music entrepreneur and businesswoman; in 1927, she opened the first Latin music store in New York City, one of only sixteen businesses owned by Puerto Rican migrant women; sister of Rafael Hernández Marín
 María Elena Holly (born 1932), widow of rock legend Buddy Holly; owns the rights to Buddy's name, image, trademarks, and other intellectual property
 Teófilo José Jaime María Le Guillou (1790–1843), a.k.a. the "Father of Vieques"; founder of the municipality of Vieques; one of the wealthiest sugar barons in Puerto Rico
 Ramón López Irizarry (1897–1982), inventor of Coco López
 Héctor Maisonave, organized 7,000 salsa concerts; owned the Casa Blanca dance club; managed Héctor Lavoe and other salsa artists
 Miguel A. García Méndez (1902–1998), founder of Western Federal Savings Bank, which later became the Westernbank Puerto Rico (now defunct)
 Gildo Massó (1926–2007), founder of Massó Enterprises and Casa's Massó
 Ralph Mercado (1941–2009), founder of RMM Records and music producer
 Luis Miranda Casañas (1937 or 1938–2019), CEO of the multi-state Universal insurance emporium
 Lisette Nieves (born 1970), founder of ATREVETE
 Rafael Antonio Nazario (born 1952) is a pianist, composer and arranger and actor who is the Co-founder of Guzman y Gomez, an Australian licensed, casual-dining restaurant chain specialising in authentic Mexican dishes and other specialty items. It is a franchised business with 107 restaurants in operation throughout Australia, Singapore and Japan. The company continues to expand with new stores around Australia. and occasional wine writer.
 Luis D. Ortiz (born 1986), real estate broker and reality television personality (series Million Dollar Listing New York)
 Wilbert Parkhurst, in 1921, founded Empresas La Famosa, Inc., a fruit processing company that by 1971 consisted of Frozen Fruits Concentrates, Inc., Toa Canning Co., La Concentradora de Puerto Rico and Bayamón Can Company
 Rafael Pérez Perry (1911–1978), in 1960 founded television channel 11, also known as Telecadena Pérez Perry, and became known as Tele Once in 1986
 Samuel A. Ramírez Sr. (born 1941) years, President and founder of Ramirez and Co., an investment banking firm on Wall Street
 Ángel Ramos (1902–1960), founder of the Telemundo television network
 Gaspar Roca (1926–2007), founder of newspaper El Vocero
 Amaury Rivera (born 1962), Chairman and CEO of Kinetics Systems Caribe
 Miguel Ruíz (1856–1912), founder of Café Yaucono
 Herb Scannell (born 1957), former Chairman of MTV Networks and president of Nickelodeon
 Juan Serrallés (1845–1921), founder of Don Q rum
 Nina Tassler, President of CBS Entertainment; the highest profile Latina in network television and one of the few executives who has the power to greenlight series
 Joseph A. Unanue (1925–2013), president and CEO of Goya Foods; son of the company's founder
 Alfonso Valdés Cobián (1890–1988), co-founder of Cervecería India, Inc. and the Puerto Rican winter baseball league; owner of the Indios de Mayagüez (Mayagüez Indians)
 Camalia Valdés (born 1972), President and CEO of Cerveceria India, Inc., Puerto Rico's largest brewery
 Salvador Vassallo (1942–2007), founder of Vassallo Industries Inc. and subsidiaries
 Richard Velázquez (born 1973), businessman and community leader; former President of NSHMBA Puerto Rico; co-founder and former President of NSHMBA Seattle; first Puerto Rican automotive designer for Porsche, first Puerto Rican product planner for Xbox 360
 María Vizcarrondo-De Soto (born 1951), first woman and Latina to become the President and CEO of the United Way of Essex and West Hudson

Cartoonists

 David Álvarez, creator of the comic strip Yenny, illustrator and storyboard artist for DC Comics' Looney Tunes series
 Ricardo Álvarez-Rivón, creator of the comic Turey
 Carmelo Filardi
 Rags Morales, comic book artist; co-creator, along with Brian Augustyn, of the 1990s version of Black Condor
 George Pérez, Marvel and DC Comics comic book artist
 John Rivas, creator of the comic strip Bonzzo
 Kenneth Rocafort, Marvel and DC Comics comic book artist
 José Vega Santana, creator of the Remi comic and impersonator of "Remi, The Clown"
 Alex Schomburg, comic book cover artist
 Angelo Torres, Mad magazine artist

Civil rights and political activists
     
 María de las Mercedes Barbudo (1773–1849), political activist; often called the first female Puerto Rican "Independentista"
 Rosario Bellber González (1881–1948), educator, social worker, women's rights activist, suffragist, and philanthropist; initiator, vice president and one of the founders of the Puerto Rico Teachers Association (Spanish: Asociación de Maestros de Puerto Rico). Bellber is also one of the founders of the Children's Hospital of Puerto Rico (Spanish: Hospital del Niño de Puerto Rico)    
 Mariana Bracetti (1825–1903) a.k.a. "Brazo de Oro" ("Golden Arm"), political activist; leader of the Lares's Revolutionary Council during the Grito de Lares; knit the first flag of the future Republic of Puerto Rico
 Mathias Brugman (1811–1868), political activist; leader of the Grito de Lares; founded the first revolutionary committee in the City of Mayagüez; his revolutionary cell was code named "Capa Prieta" (Black Cape)
 María Cadilla (1884–1951), women's rights activist; one of the first women in Puerto Rico to earn a doctoral degree
 Luisa Capetillo (1879–1922), labor activist; one of Puerto Rico's most famous labor organizers; writer and an anarchist who fought for workers and women's rights
 Alice Cardona (1930–2011), activist and community organizer
 Dennis Flores, activist and filmmaker.
 Tito Kayak (born 1958), political activist; gained notoriety when a group of Vieques natives and other Puerto Ricans began protesting and squatting on U.S. Navy bombing zones after the 1999 death of Puerto Rican civilian and Vieques native David Sanes, who was killed during a U.S. Navy bombing exercise
 Sylvia del Villard (1928–1990), Afro-Puerto Rican activist, founder of the Afro-Boricua El Coquí Theater; an outspoken activist who fought for the equal rights of the Black Puerto Rican artist; in 1981, she became the first and only director of the Office of Afro-Puerto Rican Affairs of the Instituto de Cultura Puertorriqueña (Puerto Rican Institute of Culture) (see also "Actresses")
 Isabel González (1882–1971), civil rights activist; young Puerto Rican mother who paved the way for Puerto Ricans to be given United States citizenship
 Lillian López (1925–2005), librarian and labor activist; founder of the New York Public Library South Bronx Project; advocate for library and education services for Spanish-speaking communities
 Óscar López Rivera (born 1943), pro-independence activist; the longest incarcerated FALN member
 José Maldonado Román (1874–1932), a.k.a. "Aguila Blanca" (White Eagle), revolutionary
 Rosa Martínez (b. 1952) and Eliana Martínez (1981–1989), AIDS activist; was involved in a notable Florida court case regarding the rights of HIV+ children in public schools
 Felícitas Méndez (1916–1998) (née Gómez), activist; with her husband, in 1946, led a community battle which set an important legal precedent for ending de jure segregation in the United States (see Mendez v. Westminster); credited with paving the way for integration and the American civil rights movement
 Ana María O'Neill (1894–1981), women's rights activist and educator; in 1929, became the first female professor in the field of commerce in the University of Puerto Rico, which she taught until 1951; urged women to participate in every aspect of civic life and to defend their right to vote
 Manuel Olivieri Sánchez (1888–?), civil rights activist; court interpreter and a civil rights activist who led the legal battle which granted U.S. citizenship to Puerto Ricans living in Hawaii
 Olivia Paoli (1855–1942), suffragist and activist who fought for the rights of women in Puerto Rico. She was also the founder of the first theosophist lodge in Puerto Rico.
 César A. Perales (born 1940), civil rights lawyer; founder of the Puerto Rican Legal Defense and Education Fund (now LatinoJustice PRLDEF); won precedent-setting lawsuits combating discrimination; New York Secretary of State
 Sylvia Rae Rivera (1951–2002), transgender activist; veteran of the 1969 Stonewall riots
 Anthony Romero (born 1965), civil rights leader; executive director of the American Civil Liberties Union
 Helen Rodríguez Trías (1929–2001), physician and women's rights activist; first Latina president of the American Public Health Association; a founding member of the Women's Caucus of the American Public Health Association; recipient of the Presidential Citizen's Medal; credited with helping to expand the range of public health services for women and children in minority and low-income populations in the US, Central and South America, Africa, Asia, and the Middle East (see also "Educators" and "Scientists")
Manuel Rojas (1831-1903), Venezuelan born Puerto Rican independence leader in the El Grito de Lares revolt against Spanish colonial rule
 Ana Roque (1853–1933), women's rights activist, educator and suffragist; one of the founders of the University of Puerto Rico
 Soraya Santiago Solla (1947–2020), transgender activist; first person in Puerto Rico to change the gender designation on their birth certificate following gender reassignment surgery
 Arturo Alfonso Schomburg (1874–1938), civil rights and pro-independence activist; pioneer in black history who helped raise awareness of the contributions by Afro-Latin Americans and Afro-Americans to society
 Pedro Julio Serrano (born 1974), human rights activist; President of Puerto Rico Para Tod@s, which strives for inclusion of LGBT community and for social justice for all in Puerto Rico; Communication Manager at the National Gay and Lesbian Task Force
 Marcos Xiorro, house slave; in 1821, planned and conspired to lead a slave revolt against the sugar plantation owners and the Spanish Colonial government in Puerto Rico

Nationalists
Political activists who were members of the Puerto Rican Nationalist Party:
 Elías Beauchamp (1908–1936), political activist and nationalist; in 1936, assassinated Elisha Francis Riggs, the United States-appointed police chief of Puerto Rico; considered a hero by the members of the Puerto Rican Independence Movement
 Blanca Canales (1906–1996), political activist; nationalist leader who led the Jayuya Uprising in 1950 against US colonial rule of Puerto Rico
 Rafael Cancel Miranda (1930–2020), political activist; member of the Puerto Rican Nationalist Party and advocate of Puerto Rican independence who attacked the United States House of Representatives in 1954
 Óscar Collazo (1914–1994), political activist; one of two nationalists who attempted to assassinate President Harry S. Truman
 Rosa Collazo (1904–1988) a.k.a. Rosa Cortéz Collazo, political activist and treasurer of the New York City branch of the Puerto Rican Nationalist Party
 Raimundo Díaz Pacheco (1906–1950), political activist; Commander-in-Chief of the Cadets of the Republic (Cadetes de la República), a quasi-military organization and official youth organization within the Puerto Rican Nationalist Party
 Andrés Figueroa Cordero (1924–1979), political activist; member of the Puerto Rican Nationalist Party; one of four nationalists who attacked the United States House of Representatives in 1954
 Irvin Flores Ramírez (1925–1994), political activist; Nationalist leader and activist; one of four nationalists who attacked the United States House of Representatives in 1954
 Lolita Lebrón (1919–2009), political activist; Nationalist leader and activist; the leader of four nationalists who attacked the United States House of Representatives in 1954
 Tomás López de Victoria (1911–?), political activist and Sub-Commander of the Cadets of the Republic; the captain in charge of the cadets who participated in the peaceful march which ended up as the Ponce massacre, he led the Nationalists in the Arecibo revolt in the Puerto Rican Nationalist Party Revolt of 1950
 Isolina Rondón (1913–1990), political activist and Treasurer of the Puerto Rican Nationalist Party; one of the few witnesses of the October 24, 1935 killing of four Nationalists by local police officers in Puerto Rico during a confrontation with the supporters of the Nationalist Party, known as the Río Piedras massacre
 Hiram Rosado (1911–1936), political activist and nationalist; in 1936 participated in the assassination of Elisha Francis Riggs, the United States-appointed police chief of Puerto Rico; he and his comrade Elías Beauchamp are considered heroes by the members of the Puerto Rican Independence Movement
 Isabel Rosado (1907–2015), political activist; imprisoned multiple times
 Vidal Santiago Díaz (1910–1982), political activist; barber of Pedro Albizu Campos and uncle of the novelist Esmeralda Santiago; made Puerto Rican media history when numerous police officers and National Guardsmen attacked him at his barbershop during the 1950 Nationalist Revolt; this was the first time in Puerto Rican history that such an attack was transmitted via radio to the public
 Griselio Torresola (1925–1950), political activist; Nationalist who died in an attempt to assassinate President Harry S. Truman in 1950
 Carlos Vélez Rieckehoff (1907–2005), political activist, former President of the New York chapter of the Puerto Rican Nationalist Party in the 1930s; in the 1990s was among the pro-independence activists who protested against the United States Navy's use of his birthplace, Vieques, as a bombing range
 Olga Viscal Garriga (1929–1995), political activist, member of the Puerto Rican Nationalist Party; in the late 1940s became a student leader at the University of Puerto Rico and spokesperson of the Puerto Rican Nationalist Party's branch in Río Piedras

Clergy, religion
 
Pre–20th century
 Juan Alejo de Arizmendi, first Puerto Rican Roman Catholic bishop
 Francisco Ayerra de Santa María, priest and poet
 St. Rose of Lima (Santa Rosa de Lima), her father was a Puerto Rican.
 Diego de Torres Vargas, first priest to write about the history of Puerto Rico

20th century
 David Andrés Álvarez Velázquez, second native Puerto Rican to serve as bishop of the Diocese of Puerto Rico of the Episcopal Church
 Luis Aponte Martínez, Cardinal Archbishop Emeritus of San Juan; the only Puerto Rican cleric to date to be named cardinal.
 Yiye Ávila, Pentecostal leader
 Nicky Cruz, former gangster turned minister
 Sor Isolina Ferré Aguayo, Roman Catholic nun awarded the Presidential Medal of Freedom; sister of former governor Luis Ferré Aguayo
 Juanita García Peraza, founder of the "Mita" religion
 Roberto González Nieves, Archbishop of San Juan
 Jorge Raschke, outspoken Pentecostal pastor
 Francisco Reus Froylán, first native Puerto Rican bishop of the Episcopal Church
 Carlos Manuel Rodríguez Santiago, beatified by Pope John Paul II in 2001; first Puerto Rican and first Caribbean-born layperson to be beatified

21st century
 José Luis de Jesús Miranda, controversial religious leader
 Bavi Edna Rivera, 12th woman and first Hispanic woman to become a bishop of the Episcopal Church

Composers, singers, musicians and opera performers

 
 

A
 Anuel AA (born 1992), rapper and singer-songwriter
 Mary Ann Acevedo Rivera (born 1987), singer, songwriter
 Juan F. Acosta (1890–1968), danza composer
 Johnny Albino (1919–2011), singer
 Rauw Alejandro (born 1993), singer, musician 
 Rafael Alers (1903–1978), danza composer; first Puerto Rican to compose a Hollywood musical score
 Carlos Alomar (born 1951), guitarist, composer, arranger, producer
 Zayra Álvarez (born 1974), rock singer-songwriter
 Miguel Ángel Amadeo, composer
 Marc Anthony (born 1968), singer
 Henry Arana (1921–2008), composer
 Chucho Avellanet, (born 1941), singer

B
 Bad Bunny (born 1994), rapper
 Manolo Badrena (born 1952), percussionist
 Adrienne Bailon (born 1983), singer, actress, songwriter; part of the former girl group trio 3LW, and of The Cheetah Girls
 Puchi Balseiro (1926–2007), composer
 Lloyd Banks (born 1982), rapper (Puerto Rican mother)
 Ray Barretto (1929–2006), percussionist, jazz and salsa leader
 Eddie Benítez (1956–2019), guitarist
 John Benítez (born 1957), a.k.a. "Jellybean Benítez", music producer and remixer
 Lucecita Benítez (born 1942), a.k.a. "Lucecita", singer
 Samuel Beníquez (born 1971), music producer, composer and musician
 Obie Bermúdez (born 1980), singer and composer
 Big Pun (1971–2000), rapper
 Willie Bobo (1934–1983), Latin jazz musician and bandleader. This was his stage name. His real name was William Correa.
 Ángela Bofill (born 1954), singer
 Américo Boschetti (born 1951), singer and composer
 Roy Brown (born 1945), folklore singer, composer

C
 Antonio Cabán Vale (born 1942), a.k.a. "El Topo", folklore singer, composer
 Tego Calderón (born 1972), rapper, reggaeton artist
 Héctor Campos-Parsi (1922–1998), singer, composer
 Bobby Capó (1921–1989), singer, composer
 Nydia Caro (born 1948), singer
 Vicente Carattini (1939–2005), singer and composer; composed many of Puerto Rico's Christmas themes
 Joseph Cartagena (born 1970), a.k.a. "Fat Joe", rapper
 Marta Casals Istomin (born 1936), cellist; former president of the Manhattan School of Music
 Pablo Casals (1876–1973), cellist (Puerto Rican mother), classical musician
 Kevin Ceballo (born 1977), salsa music singer
 Rafael Cepeda (1910–1996), composer; a.k.a. "Patriarch of the Bomba and Plena"
 Iris Chacón (born 1950), singer and vedette
 Keshia Chanté (born 1988), R&B and pop singer-songwriter
 Arístides Chavier Arévalo (1867–1942), pianist and composer
 José Miguel Class (1938–2017), a.k.a. "El Gallito de Manatí", singer
 Robert Clivillés (born 1964), freestyle producer; founder and member of C + C Music Factory
 Javier Colón (born 1978), singer and winner of the first season of U.S. reality series The Voice
 Santos Colón (1922–1998), singer
 Willie Colón (born 1950), salsa composer
 Rubén Colón Tarrats (born 1940), band director
 César Concepción (1909–1974), orchestra leader
 Ernesto Cordero (born 1946), composer and classical guitarist
 Federico A. Cordero (1928–2012), composer and classical guitarist
 Millie Corretjer (born 1974), singer. She is the granddaughter of Juan Antonio Corretjer, poet and a leader of the Puerto Rican Nationalist Party.
 Rafael Cortijo (1928–1982), bandleader, founder of Cortijo y Su Combo, forerunner of El Gran Combo.
 José Cosculluela (born 1980), hip hop and reggaeton artist
 Elvis Crespo (born 1971), merengue singer
 Tony Croatto (1940–2005), singer/composer of Puerto Rican folk songs
 Bobby Cruz (born 1937), salsa singer, bandleader
 Joe Cuba (1931–2009), bandleader, a.k.a. "The Father of the Boogaloo". This is his stage name. His birth name is José Calderón.
 Tite Curet Alonso (1926–2003), ballad and salsa composer

D
 Christian Daniel (born 1984), singer-songwriter
 Iluminado Dávila Medina (born 1918), cuatrista
 Héctor Delgado (born 1979), a.k.a. "el Father", reggaeton singer
 Rafael José Díaz (born 1955), a.k.a. "Rafael José", singer and television host
 Carmen Delia Dipiní (1927–1998), bolero singer
 Edgardo Díaz (born 1960), founder of the boy band Menudo
 Braulio Dueño Colón (1854–1934), composer of "Canciones Escolares"
 Huey Dunbar (born 1974), singer, member of DLG (Puerto Rican mother)

E
 Rafi Escudero (born 1945), musician, singer, composer
 Noel Estrada (1918–1979), composer of "En Mi Viejo San Juan"
 Cano Estremera (1958–2020), singer, composer and poet

F
 Lucy Fabery (1931–2015), singer
 Rene Farrait (born 1967), singer; former member of Menudo
 Cheo Feliciano (1935–2014), salsa singer; singer for Joe Cuba Sextet
 José Feliciano (born 1945), singer, composed "Feliz Navidad"
 Ruth Fernández (1919–2012), singer
 Claudio Ferrer, guitarist, singer, composer and bandleader; he was equally adept at playing popular dance music and música jíbara. A member of Cuarteto Marcano and Cuarteto Mayarí, he was known as "El Más Jíbaro de Todos los Jíbaros". 
 Elmer Figueroa (born 1968), a.k.a. "Chayanne", singer
 Narciso Figueroa (1906–2004), composer
 Pedro Flores (1894–1979), composer and bandleader
 Héctor Fonseca (born 1980), producer, musician
 Luis Fonsi (born 1978), singer

G
 Angelo García (born 1976), singer; former member of Menudo
 Kany García (born 1982), singer-songwriter
 Jenilca Giusti (born 1981), singer, songwriter, actress, model
 Eddie Gómez (born 1944), jazz musician and composer
 Tito Gómez (1948–2007), composer
 Kenny "Dope" Gonzáles (born 1970), producer, musician; member of Masters At Work

H
 Jazz Hamilton (born 1965), recording artist, arranger, composer, saxophonist, producer
 Edward W. Hardy (born 1992), composer, violinist, violist, producer, and actor, known for his off-Broadway musical The Woodsman
 Hex Hector (born 1965), Grammy Award-winning remixer and producer
 Oscar Hernández (born 1954), salsa musician; composed the musical theme for the television series Sex and the City
 Rafael Hernández Marín (1891–1965), composer
 Giovanni Hidalgo (born 1963), percussionist
 Lee Holdridge (born 1944), television and film score composer

I
 Rafael Ithier (born 1926), musician; founder of El Gran Combo orchestra

J
 Nicky Jam (born 1981), singer-songwriter
 Janid, singer, songwriter, reality TV personality
 Orlando Javier Valle Vega, a.k.a. "Chencho", singer, producer
 Carmita Jiménez (1939–2003), a.k.a. "La Dama de la Canción", singer
 Jim Jones (rapper) (Born 1976), Father is Puerto Rican

K
 Kane & Abel, rap duo
 Tori Kelly (born 1992), singer (father is half Puerto Rican)

L
 La India (born 1970), salsa singer. Her birth name is Linda Caballero.
 George Lamond (born 1967), pop/salsa singer
 William Landrón (born 1978), a.k.a. "Don Omar", reggaeton singer
 Tito Lara (1932–1987), singer
 Daniel Larze (Filipino-Puerto Rican singer) (born 2005), Puerto Rican singer
 Héctor Lavoe (1946–1993), salsa singer
 Raphy Leavitt (1948–2015), composer, musical director
 Elizabeth le Fey, singer, songwriter
 Manny Lehman, music producer, DJ
 Lisa M (born 1974), rapper
 Jennifer López (born 1969), singer (both parents are Puerto Rican)
 Johnny Lozada (born 1967), singer
 Luis Lozada (born 1971), rapper
 Papo Lucca (born 1946), pianist
 Lunna (born 1947), singer

M
 Manny Manuel (born 1972), singer
 Víctor Manuelle (born 1968), salsa singer
 Bruno Mars (born 1985), singer and songwriter (father is Puerto Rican)
 Ricky Martin (born 1971), singer; former member of Menudo
 Angie Martínez (born 1972), singer, actress, radio personality
 Ladislao Martínez (1898–1979), virtuoso cuatro player known as "El Maestro Ladí".
 Melanie Martínez (born 1995), Puerto Rican-Dominican singer-songwriter
 Carolyne Mas (born 1955), singer-songwriter, musician, and performer
 Charlie Masso (born 1969), singer; former member of Menudo
 Paul Masvidal (born 1971), guitarist, singer, and songwriter with international recording artists Cynic
 Maxwell (born 1973), R&B and neo-soul singer (Puerto Rican father)
 Lisette Meléndez (born 1967), freestyle/Latin-pop singer
 Ricky Meléndez (born 1967), singer; former member of "Menudo
 Syesha Mercado (born 1987), singer and finalist on American Idol (Puerto Rican father)
 Julia Michaels - singer, songwriter (Mexican-Puerto Rican Father) 
 Luis Miguel (born 1970), a.k.a. "sol de Mexico", singer and songwriter
 Elsa Miranda (1922–2007), singer who was featured on radio and television in the United States during the Golden Age of Radio in the 1940s
 Ismael Miranda (born 1950), "El Niño Bonito de la Salsa", singer and composer, Fania All-Star
 Lin-Manuel Miranda (born 1980), Grammy-, Tony-, and MacArthur "Genius" Award-winning composer, lyricist, and actor, known for his Broadway musicals In the Heights and Hamilton
 Ángel Mislán (1862–1911), composer of danzas
 José Luis Moneró (1921–2011), composer and band leader
 Yolandita Monge (born 1955), singer, television host and theatrical actress
 Gilberto Monroig (1930–1996), bolero singer
 Glenn Monroig (born 1957), composer, singer; sang the first rap song in Spanish
 Andy Montáñez (born 1942), salsa singer
 David Morales (born 1962), deejay, composer, and music producer
 Florencio Morales Ramos (1915–1989), a.k.a. "Ramito", composer of plenas and one of the foremost singers of música jíbara; composed "Que Bonita Bandera", which, on March 19, 2009, served as the wake-up call for Puerto Rican astronaut Joseph M. Acaba and the crew aboard the Discovery Space Shuttle
 Mark Morales (born 1960), a.k.a. "Prince Markie Dee", rapper, and producer
 Noro Morales (1911–1964), pianist, composer, arranger and bandleader
 Juan Morel Campos (1857–1896), composer of danzas; uncle of Pedro Albizu Campos.
 Carli Muñoz (born 1948), pianist, composer, arranger, bandleader, and producer
 Rafael Muñoz (1900–1961), orchestra leader. In 1934, he composed the musical score for Romance Tropical the first Puerto Rican movie with sound and the second Spanish movie with sound in the world.

N
 Ednita Nazario (born 1955), singer
 Rafael Nazario (born 1952), pianist, composer and arranger and actor. He has had a parallel career as chef, author and occasional wine writer.
 Joe Negroni (1940–1978), Rock and Roll Hall of Famer, member of The Teenagers
 Tito Nieves (born 1958), salsa singer; his version of "I Like it Like That" was part of a national Burger King commercial
 Noelia (born 1979), singer, songwriter and actress
 Nova y Jory, reggaeton duo

O
 Tommy Olivencia (1938–2006), salsa bandleader, trumpet player, singer
 Tony Orlando (born 1944), singer (Puerto Rican mother)
 Choco Orta (born 1977), salsa singer
 Jeannie Ortega (born 1986), R&B and reggaeton singer
 Claudette Ortiz (born 1981), singer, R&B group City High
 Joell Ortiz (born 1980), rapper
 Luis "Perico" Ortiz (born 1949), salsa singer, trumpeter, composer, musical arranger and producer
 Shalim Ortiz (born 1979), a.k.a. "Shalim", singer, actor
 Pedro Ortiz Davila (1912–1986), a.k.a. "Davilita", bolero singer; he was an advocate of Puerto Rican independence.
 Juan Carlos Ozuna Rosado (born 1992), a.k.a. "Ozuna", reggaeton and Latin trap singer

P
 Charlie Palmieri (1926–1988), pianist, bandleader
 Eddie Palmieri (born 1936), pianist, composer, bandleader; 2013 National Endowment of Arts Jazz Master; nine-time Grammy Award winner
 José Enrique Pedreira (1904–1959), danza composer
 Ángel "Cuco" Peña (born 1948), musician, composer and producer
 René Pérez (born 1978), singer, member of Calle 13
 Lourdes Pérez (born 1961), singer, songwriter; folk, nueva canción, and nueva trova singer
 Martha Pesante (born 1972), a.k.a. "Ivy Queen" and "The Queen of Reggaeton", reggaeton singer
 Plan B, reggaeton duo
 Carlos Ponce (born 1972), singer
 Rebeca Pous Del Toro (born 1978), Spanish pop singer; cousin of Benicio del Toro
 Miguel Poventud (1942–1983), a.k.a. "El Nino Prodigio de Guayama" and "Miguelito"; musician, singer and composer of boleros
 Tito Puente (1923–2000), musician, composer, arranger and producer, a.k.a. the "King of Latin Music" or "the Mambo King"

Q
 Ismael Quintana (1937–2016), salsa singer, lead vocalist with Eddie Palmeri's original band La Perfecta
 José Ignacio Quintón (1881–1925), pianist and composer of danzas
 Domingo Quiñones (born 1963), singer, actor
 Luciano Quiñones (born 1948), danza composer

R
 Chamaco Ramírez (1941–1983), salsa singer
 Val Ramos (born 1958), international flamenco guitarist
 Richie Ray (born 1945), a.k.a. "The King of Salsa", singer, composer
 Sylvia Rexach (1922–1961), singer, composer
 Ray Reyes (1970–2021), singer, member of Menudo and Proyecto M
 Ron Reyes (born 1960), singer for Black Flag, 1979–1980
 Juan Ríos Ovalle (1863–1928), composer of danzas, musician and orchestra director
 Gabriel Ríos (born 1978), musician
 Gerardo Rivas (born 1982), salsa singer
 Danny Rivera (born 1945), singer
 Ismael Rivera (1931–1987), a.k.a. "El Sonero Mayor", salsa singer
 Jerry Rivera (born 1973), salsa singer; first salsa artist to perform on The Tonight Show
 Mon Rivera (1899–1978), trombonist and singer
 Tomás Rivera Morales (1927–2001) a.k.a. "Maso Rivera", composer; child music prodigy who composed over 1,000 instrumental compositions for the cuatro, among which he treasured the waltz. He is considered to be a virtuoso cuatrista.
 Augusto Rodríguez (1904–1993),  composer and chorus director; founder of the choir of the University of Puerto Rico
 Chino Rodriguez (born 1954), salsa musician, trombonist, composer, artist manager, producer, talent agent; founder of Oriente Music Group and Latin Music Booking (Puerto Rican mother, Chinese father)
 Daniel Rodríguez (born 1964), former police officer turned operatic tenor
 Felipe Rodríguez (1926–1999), a.k.a. "La Voz", singer of boleros
 Julito Rodríguez (1925–2013), singer and leader of one of the most important tríos.
 Lalo Rodríguez (born 1958), salsa singer; was part of the first two records to win the first two Latin Grammy Awards; first artist to sell over one million salsa records in Spain
 Pellin Rodríguez (1926–1984), salsa singer; member of the musical group El Gran Combo. Toured with the group all over Europe and Latin America He was related to Gilberto Concepción de Gracia, founder of the Partido Independentista Puertorriqueño (Puerto Rican Independence Party).
 Tito Rodríguez (1923–1973), singer and bandleader
 Pete "El Conde" Rodríguez (1933–2000), salsa singer, Fania All-Star
 Omar Rodríguez-López (born 1975), composer and guitarist
 Roberto Roena (born 1940), percussionist and band leader
 Kelis Rogers (born 1979), singer and television host (Chinese-Puerto Rican mother)
 Tito Rojas (1955–2020), salsa singer
 Ivette Román-Roberto, experimental vocalist
 Marta Romero (1928–2013), singer and actress
 Draco Rosa, singer, composer
 Ralphi Rosario (born 1959), producer, DJ, musician
 Willie Rosario (born 1930), composer, timbalero, bandleader
 Felipe Rose (born 1954), singer
 Julita Ross (1919–1981), singer of danzas
 Roy Rosselló (born 1971), singer, former member of Menudo
 Frankie Ruiz (1958–1998), salsa singer
 Maelo Ruiz,  (born 1966) salsa singer
 Hilton Ruiz (1952–2006), jazz composer/musician

S
 Jimmy Sabater Sr. (1936–2012), musician; three-time winner of the ACE Awards
 Fernando and Nefty Sallaberry (born 1964, born 1965), singers; former members of Menudo
 Bobby Sanabria (born 1957), Latin jazz musician, drummer, percussionist, composer, arranger, 8X Grammy nominee as a leader, educator, documentary film producer
 Claudio Sánchez (born 1978), singer; lead singer, lyricist and guitarist of Coheed and Cambria
 Jesús María Sanromá (1902–1984), composer; first person ever to be named official pianist of the Boston Symphony Orchestra
 Gilberto Santa Rosa (born 1962), salsa singer
 Daniel Santos (1916–1992), composer, singer of boleros and Cuban guarachas; he was an advocate of Puerto Rican independence.
 Ray Santos (1928–2019), arranger and composer, saxophonist, Grammy winner, The Mambo Kings
 Romeo Santos (born 1981), bachata singer; former member of Aventura (Puerto Rican mother)
 Adalberto Santiago (born 1937), salsa singer
 Eddie Santiago (born 1955), salsa singer
 Herman Santiago (born 1941), rock n roll singer and Hall of Famer; composed song "Why Do Fools Fall in Love"
 Marvin Santiago (1947–2004), salsa singer
 Dr. Zoraida Santiago (born 1952), singer and composer
 Nino Segarra (born 1954), salsa singer
 Ray Sepúlveda, salsa singer
 Xavier Serbiá (born 1968), singer; former member of "Menudo
 Roberto Sierra (born 1953), classical music composer, famous for his Missa Latina
 Myrta Silva (1917–1987), a.k.a. "La Gorda de Oro" and "Madame Chencha", singer, composer
 Arturo Somohano (1910–1977), composer; symphony orchestra conductor
 Ivette Sosa (born 1976), singer; member of Eden's Crush
 Brenda K. Starr (born 1966), salsa singer (Puerto Rican mother)
 Michael Stuart (born 1975), salsa singer
 Sweet Sensation, freestyle trio

T
 Nedra Talley (born 1946), singer, member of "The Ronettes" who were inducted into the Rock n Roll Hall of Fame in 2007.
 Olga Tañón (born 1967), singer, composer
 Manuel Gregorio Tavárez (1843–1883), composer, known as "The Father of the Puerto Rican danza"
 Gerardo Teissonniere (born 1961), classical pianist and teacher
 Daniel Ticotin (born 1969), singer and musician
 Juan Tizol (1900–1984), jazz musician and composer, extended period with Duke Ellington
 TKA, freestyle trio
 Ray Toro (born 1977), lead guitarist (My Chemical Romance)
 Yomo Toro (1933–2012), musician, guitarist, and "cuatrista"
 Manoella Torres (born 1954), singer
 Eladio Torres (born 1950), musician, singer and composer
 Néstor Torres (born 1957), musician; Latin Grammy Award-winning preeminent flautist in the Latin jazz genre
 Tommy Torres (born 1971), singer, composer, musician
 Tony Touch (born 1969), singer

V
 Yolanda Vadiz (1959–1987), gospel singer
 Gary Valenciano (born 1964), Filipino musician (Puerto Rican mother)
 Bobby Valentín (born 1941), musician, bandleader
 José Vázquez-Cofresí (born 1975), bandleader, musician, composer and producer
 Mario Vázquez (born 1977), pop and R&B singer; 2005 American Idol contestant
 Myrna Vázquez (1935–1975), actress and activist
 Little Louie Vega (born 1965), producer, musician; member of Masters At Work
 Tony Vega (born 1957), salsa singer
 Lisa Vélez (born 1967), singer of Lisa Lisa and Cult Jam
 Norberto_Vélez (born 1979), salsa singer, composer, producer, arranger and entertainer 
 Wilkins Vélez (born 1953), a.k.a. "Wilkins", singer and composer

W
 Wisin & Yandel, reggaeton duo, known as "El Duo de la Historia"

Y
 Yaga y Mackie, reggaeton duo
 Daddy Yankee (born Ramón Ayala) (born 1977), reggaeton singer
 Yomo (born 1981), reggaeton artist

Z
 Zabdiel de Jesus, Singer
 Miguel Zenón (born 1976), jazz saxophonist
 Zion y Lennox, reggaeton duo

Opera

 Martina Arroyo (born 1936), operatic soprano; part of the first generation of black opera singers to achieve wide success
 Justino Díaz (born 1940), opera singer
 Pablo Elvira (1937–2000), baritone, opera singer
 Benjamín Marcantoni, operatic countertenor
 Ana María Martínez (born 1971), soprano
 Julia Migenes (born 1949), soprano
 Amalia Paoli (1861–1941), soprano
 Antonio Paolí (1871–1946), tenor
 Melliangee Pérez (born 1976), opera soprano; awarded Soprano of the Year by UNESCO
 Graciela Rivera (1921–2011), soprano; first Puerto Rican to sing a lead role in the Metropolitan Opera

Criminals and outlaws

Pre-20th century
 Roberto Cofresí, a.k.a. '"El Pirata Cofresí"' (Cofresí the Pirate); his exploits as a pirate are part of Puerto Rico's folklore

20th century
 Salvador Agrón, a.k.a. "The Capeman", criminal and poet
 Antonio Correa Cotto, bandit/outlaw
 Jose Garcia Cosme, a.k.a. "Papo Cachete", drug kingpin.
 Antonio García López, a.k.a. "Toño Bicicleta", outlaw
 Raymond Márquez, a.k.a. "Spanish Raymond", Harlem numbers kingpin.
 Isabel la Negra, madam of a brothel
 Edsel Torres Gómez, a.k.a. "Negri", drug kingpin
 Tony Tursi, mobster

21st century
 José Figueroa Agosto, drug kingpin; and porn star known as "the Pablo Escobar of the Caribbean"
 Ariel Castro, kidnapper
 José Padilla, convicted Al-Qaeda operative
 Esteban Santiago, Fort Lauderdale shooter
 Alex Trujillo, drug dealer and preacher

Diplomats

20th century
 Adrian A. Basora, former U.S. Ambassador to the Czech Republic
 Gabriel Guerra-Mondragón, former U.S. Ambassador to Chile
 Luis Guinot, former U.S. Ambassador to Costa Rica
 Victor Marrero, former U.S. Ambassador to the OAS
 Spencer Matthews King, former U.S. Ambassador to Guyana
 Edward G. Miller Jr., lawyer who served as Assistant Secretary of State for Inter-American Affairs from 1949 to 1952
 Teodoro Moscoso, former U.S. Ambassador to Venezuela and head of Alliance for Progress (see also "Politicians")
 Horacio Rivero, Admiral (Ret.), former U.S. Ambassador to Spain (see also "Military")

21st century
 Mari Carmen Aponte, U.S. Ambassador to El Salvador
 César Benito Cabrera, former U.S. Ambassador to Mauritius and the Seychelles
 Hans Hertell, former U.S. Ambassador to the Dominican Republic

Educators

 Ursula Acosta, educator; one of the founding members of the Sociedad Puertorriqueña de Genealogía (Puerto Rican Genealogical Society)
 Alfredo M. Aguayo, educator and writer; established the first laboratory of child psychology at the University of Havana
 Carlos Albizu Miranda, psychologist, educator; first Hispanic educator to have a North American university renamed in his honor and one of the first Hispanics to earn a PhD in psychology in the US
 Margot Arce de Vázquez, educator; founder of the department of Hispanic studies in the University of Puerto Rico
 Rosario Bellber González, educator, social worker, women's rights activist, suffragist, and philanthropist; initiator, vice president and one of the founders of the Puerto Rico Teachers Association (Spanish: Asociación de Maestros de Puerto Rico). Bellber is also one of the founders of the Children's Hospital of Puerto Rico (Spanish: Hospital del Niño de Puerto Rico)    
 Jaime Benítez, former resident commissioner; longest-serving chancellor and president of the University of Puerto Rico
 Frank Bonilla, educator; academic who became a leading figure in Puerto Rican studies
Emma Brossard, professor of politics and government at the Louisiana State University and noted expert on the Venezuelan oil industry
 Carlos E. Chardón Palacios, first Puerto Rican mycologist and first Puerto Rican appointed as chancellor of the University of Puerto Rico
 Carlos A. Chardón López, educator and public administrator; the only Puerto Rican to serve twice as Puerto Rico Secretary of Education
 Edna Coll, educator and author; president of the Society of Puerto Rican Authors in San Juan; founder of the Academy of Fine Arts in Puerto Rico
 Celestina Cordero, educator; in 1820, founded the first school for girls in Puerto Rico
 Rafael Cordero, educator; declared venerable in 2004 by Pope John Paul II; the process for beatification is now in motion with Benedictine Fr. Oscar Rivera as Procurator of the Cause
 Waded Cruzado, first Hispanic president of Montana State University
 Eugenio María de Hostos, educator; in Peru, he helped to develop that country's educational system and spoke against the harsh treatment given to the Chinese who lived there. He stayed in Chile from 1870 to 1873. During his stay there, he taught at the University of Chile and gave a speech titled "The Scientific Education of Women;" he proposed that governments permit women in their colleges; soon after, Chile allowed women to enter its college educational system (see also "Politicians" and "Authors).
 Angelo Falcón, political scientist; author of Atlas of Stateside Puerto Ricans (2004); co-editor of Boricuas in Gotham: Puerto Ricans in the Making of Modern New York City (2004)
 José Ferrer Canales, educator, writer and activist
 Megh R. Goyal, professor, historian, scientist; "father of irrigation engineering in Puerto Rico"; professor in agricultural and biomedical engineering at University of Puerto Rico
 Sonia Gutierrez, American educator and Hispanic rights activist; principal, counselor and advocate for adult students at the Carlos Rosario International Public Charter School, an adult charter school in Washington, D.C.
 Felix V. Matos Rodriguez, educator; chancellor of the City University of New York
 Concha Meléndez, educator, writer, poet
 Ana G. Méndez, educator; founder of the Ana G. Méndez University System
 Ingrid Montes, educator, professor of chemistry at the University of Puerto Rico, Río Piedras
 Antonio Miró Montilla, architect, educator; first architect appointed head of a government agency, the Puerto Rico Public Buildings Authority, 1969–71; first dean of the School of Architecture at the University of Puerto Rico, Río Piedras Campus, 1971–78; chancellor of the Río Piedras Campus of the University of Puerto Rico, 1978–85
 Antonia Pantoja, educator; founder of ASPIRA; awarded the Presidential Medal of Freedom
 Ángel Ramos, educator; superintendent of the Sequoia Schools for the Deaf and Hard of Hearing; one of the few deaf Hispanics to earn a doctorate from Gallaudet University
 Juan A. Rivero, educator; founded the Dr. Juan A. Rivero Zoo in Mayagüez; discovered numerous animal species and has written several books
 Havidan Rodriguez, educator and scholar; president of the University at Albany, SUNY, 2017–present; first Latino/Hispanic President of any four-year SUNY institution
 Ana Roque, educator and suffragist; one of the founders of the University of Puerto Rico
 Carlos E. Santiago, economist and educator; chancellor of the University of Wisconsin-Milwaukee
 Ninfa Segarra, New York City Council member; president of the New York City Board of Education, 2000–02
 Victoria Leigh Soto, educator who emerged as a hero in the tragic shooting at Sandy Hook Elementary School in Newtown, Connecticut, when she hid students and died trying to protect them from alleged shooter Adam Lanza; her father is Puerto Rican
 Lolita Tizol, early 1900s educator; at a time when most people in Ponce, as most of Puerto Rico, did not know how to read and write, and when teachers were paid only $50 per month, even in the large cities, Tizol took it upon herself to overcome all challenges to help others
 Nilita Vientós Gastón, educator; first female lawyer to work for the Department of Justice of Puerto Rico; defended the use of the Spanish language in the courts of Puerto Rico, before the Supreme Court, and won
 Mariano Villaronga-Toro, educator and public servant; first commissioner of public instruction after the creation of the Estado Libre Asociado; instituted the use of Spanish as the official language of instruction in the Puerto Rico public education system, displacing English, which had been pushed by the US-appointed colonial governors

Governors of Puerto Rico

Pre-20th century
 Juan Ponce de León, lived with his family in Puerto Rico; Spanish explorer and conquistador; became the first Governor of Puerto Rico by appointment of the Spanish crown; led the first European expedition to Florida, which he named; his remains are buried in a crypt in the Cathedral of San Juan Bautista in San Juan
 Juan Ponce de León II, first Puerto Rican acting governor (1579)

20th century
 Luis A. Ferré, third elected governor of Puerto Rico (1969–1973); philanthropist who donated Museo de Arte de Ponce to the people of Puerto Rico; industrialist who founded the Puerto Rico Cement Company and Ponce Cement, Inc., and developed Puerto Rico Iron Works into a successful foundry
 Rafael Hernández Colón, fourth elected governor of Puerto Rico (1973–1977 and 1985–1993)
 Juan Bernardo Huyke, second Puerto Rican native to serve as temporary Governor of Puerto Rico; in 1923, he served as interim governor between the administrations of Emmet Montgomery Reily and Horace Mann Towner
 Luis Muñoz Marín, first elected governor of Puerto Rico (1949–1965)
 Jesús T. Piñero, first Puerto Rican to be named governor of the Island by a U.S. President (1946–1949)
 Carlos Romero Barceló, fifth elected governor of Puerto Rico (1977–1985)
 Pedro Rosselló, sixth elected governor of Puerto Rico (1993–2001)
 Roberto Sánchez Vilella, second elected governor of Puerto Rico (1965–1969)

21st century
 Aníbal Acevedo Vilá, eighth elected governor of Puerto Rico (2005–2009)
 Sila Calderón, seventh elected and first female governor of Puerto Rico (2001–2005)
 Luis Fortuño, ninth elected governor of Puerto Rico (2009–2013)
 Alejandro García Padilla, tenth elected governor of Puerto Rico (2013–2017)
 Ricky Rosselló, 11th elected governor of Puerto Rico (2017–2019)
 Pedro Pierluisi, served as de facto governor of Puerto Rico from August 2 to August 7, 2019 (judicially annulled)
 Wanda Vázquez Garced, 13th governor of Puerto Rico (2019–2021)
 Pedro Pierluisi, the 14th Governor of Puerto Rico (2021–Present)

First Ladies of Puerto Rico

First Lady or First Gentleman of Puerto Rico, a.k.a. Primera Dama o Primer Caballero de Puerto Rico in Spanish, is the official title given by the government of Puerto Rico to the spouse of the governor of Puerto Rico or the relatives of the governor, should the holder be unmarried. The governor's spouse leads the Office of the First Lady or First Gentleman of Puerto Rico. The position of First Lady or First Gentleman carries no official duty and receives no compensation for their service. They generally oversee the administration of La Fortaleza, the mansion that serves as the governor's residence and office. They also organize events and civic programs, and typically get involved in different charities and social causes.
 Conchita Dapena, First Lady of Puerto Rico (1965–1966)
 Luisa Gándara, First Lady of Puerto Rico (2005–2009)
 Lila Mayoral Wirshing, youngest First Lady of Puerto Rico (1973–1977, 1985–1992)
 Inés Mendoza, First Lady of Puerto Rico (1949–1965); revered teacher and cultural leader
 Jeannette Ramos, First Lady of Puerto Rico (1967–1969)
 Kate de Romero, First Lady of Puerto Rico (1977–1985); Trustee of the Conservation Trust of Puerto Rico
 Lucé Vela, First Lady of Puerto Rico (2009–2013)
 Wilma Pastrana, First Lady of Puerto Rico (2013–2017)
 Beatriz Areizaga, First Lady of Puerto Rico (2017–2019)
 Irma Margarita "Maga" Neváres, First Lady of Puerto Rico (1993–2001)

First Gentleman of Puerto Rico
 Jorge Díaz Reverón First Gentleman of Puerto Rico (August 7, 2019 – 2021); married to Governor Wanda Vázquez Garced.

Historians
 
 Iñigo Abbad y Lasierra, first historian (Spanish) to extensively document Puerto Rico's history, nationality and culture
 Delma S. Arrigoitia, historian, author; first person in the University of Puerto Rico to earn a master's degree in the field of history; in 2010, her book, Puerto Rico Por Encima de Todo: Vida y Obra de Antonio R. Barceló, 1868–1938, was recognized among the best in the category of "research and criticism" and awarded a first place prize by the Ateneo Puertorriqueño
 Pilar Barbosa, University of Puerto Rico professor; author; first modern-day Official Historian of Puerto Rico
 Salvador Brau, historian, first Official Historian of Puerto Rico
 Cayetano Coll y Toste, historian; best known for his classic work Boletín Histórico de Puerto Rico.
 Adolfo de Hostos, historian
 Luis González Vale, historian
 Francisco Lluch Mora, known for his legendary book Orígenes y Fundación de Ponce y Otras Noticias Relativas a su Desarrollo Urbano, Demográfico y Cultural (Siglos XVI-XIX)
 Eduardo Neumann Gandía, historian, known for his 19th-century History of Ponce
 Francisco Mariano Quiñones, historian; first Official Historian of Puerto Rico
 Antonio Mirabal, historian, poet and writer
 Andrés Ramos Mattei, historian
 Tony Santiago, military historian

Journalists

 Veronica Cintron, Award Winning primetime solo anchor
 José Julián Acosta, journalist and advocate of the abolition of slavery
 José Andino y Amezquita, first Puerto Rican journalist
 María Celeste Arrarás, anchor for Al Rojo Vivo
 Isabel Cuchí Coll, journalist and author; granddaughter of Cayetano Coll y Toste and niece of José Coll y Cuchí; served as Director of the "Sociedad de Autores Puertorriqueños
 Lynda Baquero, reporter, WNBC in New York City
 Bárbara Bermudo, journalist; co-host of Univision's Primer Impacto
 Marysol Castro, co-host of ABC's Good Morning America
 Antonio Cortón, late 19th century writer, journalist, literary critic, and editor of newspaper in Barcelona, Spain. He wrote  and the biography of José de Espronceda, a 19th century poet.
 Christopher Crommett, Atlanta-based Executive Vice President of CNN en Español.
 Carmen Dominicci, co-host of Univision's Primer Impacto
 Malín Falú, Spanish language radio and television host
 Manuel Fernández Juncos, journalist and short story writer; lyricist who wrote the lyrics to "La Borinqueña"
 Juan González, New York City investigative journalist
 Aníbal González Irizarry, former newscaster for Telenoticias en acción
 Jackie Guerrido, journalist and meteorologist for Univision's Despierta América
 Kimberly Guilfoyle, Court TV journalist; former First Lady of San Francisco (Puerto Rican mother)
 César Andreu Iglesias, founding editor of Claridad newspaper; novelist/independence activist
 Carmen Jovet, journalist, first Puerto Rican woman named a news anchor in Puerto Rico
 Michele LaFountain, anchor for the Spanish version of ESPN Sports Center
 Alycia Lane, journalist and news anchor on KYW-TV in Philadelphia
 Lynda López, New York City television news personality; sister of Jennifer López
 Natalie Morales, journalist and news anchor on NBC's The Today Show
 Denisse Oller, Emmy Award-winning New York City television news anchor
 Audrey Puente, 'New York City meteorologist; daughter of Tito Puente
 Carlos D. Ramirez, publisher of El Diario La Prensa, New York City's largest Spanish-language newspaper
 Jorge L. Ramos, Emmy Award-winning New York City television news anchor
 Geraldo Rivera, attorney, journalist, writer, reporter and former talk show host; hosts the newsmagazine program Geraldo at Large, and appears regularly on Fox News Channel
 Darlene Rodríguez, New York City television news anchor
 Rubén Sánchez, radio and television journalist
 Edna Schmidt, anchor for Telefutura
 Ray Suárez, Senior Correspondent for The NewsHour with Jim Lehrer
 Guillermo José Torres, journalist and news anchor for WAPA-TV
 Elizabeth Vargas, television journalist; former co-anchor of ABC World News Tonight
 Antonio Vélez Alvarado, journalist; "father of the Puerto Rican flag"
 Jane Vélez-Mitchell, anchor for the HLN news network (Puerto Rican mother)

Judges, law enforcement and firefighters

Judges

 Cathy Bissoon, judge for the United States District Court for the Western District of Pennsylvania; first Hispanic female Article III judge in Pennsylvania
 José Andreu García, former PR Chief Justice and sports official
 José A. Cabranes, 2nd Circuit Court of Appeals Judge; first Puerto Rican to serve as a federal judge in the continental United States
 Albert Diaz, Judge of the United States Court of Appeals for the Fourth Circuit; first Puerto Rican and first Hispanic Judge to serve the Fourth Circuit Court of Appeals; former Appellate Judge for the Navy-Marine Corps Court of Criminal Appeals
 Luis Estrella Martínez, youngest associate justice, at 39, of the current 9-member Puerto Rico Supreme Court
 Julio M. Fuentes, Judge of the United States Court of Appeals for the Third Circuit; first Puerto Rican and first Hispanic judge to serve the Third Circuit Court of Appeals
 Gustavo Gelpí, Judge of the United States District Court for the District of Puerto Rico (2006–present)
 Angel G. Hermida, Superior Court Judge, Commonwealth of Puerto Rico (1976–1997); visiting professor in Comparative Law at Boston University (1984); Chief Clerk of the Supreme Court of Puerto Rico (1974–1976); Physics professor at the University of Puerto Rico, Mayagüez Campus (1964–1966); author of MIRIAM J. RAMÍREZ DE FERRER Recurrente Vs. JUAN MARI BRAS, which decided that citizens of Puerto Rico have a right to vote in Puerto Rican elections, whether or not they are citizens of the United States
 Federico Hernández Denton, former Chief Justice of the Puerto Rico Supreme Court; Puerto Rico's first Consumer Affairs Secretary
 Dora Irizarry, Chief Judge of the United States District Court for the Eastern District of New York; first female Hispanic state judge in New York
 Erick Kolthoff, Associate Justice of the Supreme Court of Puerto Rico; first Puerto Rican of African descent to be named Associate Justice of the Supreme Court of Puerto Rico
 Victor Marrero, Judge of the United States District Court for the Southern District of New York
 Maite Oronoz Rodriguez,  first openly LGBTQ female Chief Justice in United States history, the third woman to preside the Supreme Court of Puerto Rico and the youngest person to do so.
 Nitza Quiñones Alejandro, Judge of the United States District Court for the Eastern District of Pennsylvania; first lesbian Latina ever to be nominated by a U.S. president, in this case President Obama, to serve as a federal judge
 Roberto Rivera-Soto, first Puerto Rican and Latino New Jersey State Supreme Court Justice
 Clemente Ruiz Nazario, first Puerto Rican U.S. Federal Judge of Puerto Rico
 Vanessa Ruiz, Associate Judge of the District of Columbia Court of Appeals; Associate Judge of the District of Columbia Court of Appeals, the highest court for the District of Columbia
 A. Cecil Snyder, controversial Chief Justice and U.S. attorney in Puerto Rico
 Sonia Sotomayor, first Puerto Rican woman to serve as an (2nd Cir.) U.S. Circuit Court of Appeals judge and first Hispanic to be nominated and confirmed as an Associate Justice of the Supreme Court of the United States
 Juan R. Torruella, first Puerto Rican to serve as Chief Judge of the United States Court of Appeals for the First Circuit
 Edgardo Ramos, United States District Judge of the United States District Court for the Southern District of New York since 2011.
 José Trías Monge, former Chief Justice, Attorney General of Puerto Rico, author
 Carmen Consuelo Cerezo, first female Puerto Rican federal district judge and Chief Judge
 Marilyn Zayas, first Latina and Puerto Rican judge elected to an Ohio State Court of Appeals
Laws in the U.S. inspired by Puerto Ricans
 Briana's Law – Briana Ojeda was an 11-year-old girl who died in the summer of 2010 when a police officer did not perform CPR on her after she suffered from an asthma attack. Briana's Law, which requires that every police officer and member of the State Police, including police officer trainees and state police cadets, receive CPR training prior to employment as well as during employment every two years, was named in her honor.
 Gonzales v. Williams – Isabel González was a Puerto Rican activist who helped pave the way for Puerto Ricans to be given United States citizenship. González challenged the Government of the United States in the groundbreaking case Gonzales v. Williams (192 U.S. 1 (1904)). Her Supreme Court case is the first time that the Court confronted the citizenship status of inhabitants of territories acquired by the United States. González actively pursued the cause of U.S. citizenship for all Puerto Ricans by writing letters published in The New York Times.
 Mendez v. Westminster – Felicitas Gomez Mendez was a pioneer of the American civil rights movement. In 1946, Mendez and her husband led an educational civil rights battle that changed California and set an important legal precedent for ending de jure segregation in the United States. Their landmark desegregation case, known as Mendez v. Westminster, paved the way for meaningful integration, public school reform, and the American civil rights movement.
Law enforcement

 Nicholas Estavillo, NYPD Chief of Patrol (Ret.); in 2002, became first Puerto Rican and first Hispanic in the history of the NYPD to reach the three-star rank of Chief of Patrol
 Faith Evans, Hawaiian-Puerto Rican, first woman to be named U.S. Marshal
 Alejandro González Malavé, controversial undercover police officer
 Irma Lozada, New York City transit police; first female police officer to die in the line of duty in New York City
 José Meléndez-Pérez, INS officer who was named in 9/11 Commission Report; denied entry to terrorist in August 2001
 Benito Romano, United States Attorney in New York; first Puerto Rican to hold the United States Attorney's post in New York on an interim basis
 Joe Sánchez, former New York City police officer and author whose books give an insight as to the corruption within the department
 Pedro Toledo, retired FBI senior agent and longest-serving state police superintendent
 Alex Villanueva, Los Angeles County Sheriff

Firefighters
 Raúl Gándara-Cartagena, first and longest-serving Commonwealth fire chief in Puerto Rico, 1942–1972
 Carlos M. Rivera, former Fire Commissioner of the City of New York; first Hispanic commissioner in the New York City Fire Department's 127-year history

Military

                        
            

16th century
 Agüeybaná II, Cacique of "Borikén" (Puerto Rico); led the Taínos in the fight against Juan Ponce de León and the conquistadores in the Taíno Rebellion of 1511.

17th century
 Juan de Amézqueta, Captain, Puerto Rican Militia; defeated Captain Balduino Enrico (Boudewijn Hendricksz), who in 1625 was ordered by the Dutch to capture Puerto Rico

18th century
 Rafael Conti, Colonel, Spanish Army; in 1790, captured 11 enemy ships involved in smuggling stolen goods. In 1797, he helped defeat Sir Ralph Abercromby and defend Puerto Rico from a British invasion in his hometown, Aguadilla. In 1809, he organized a military expedition fight with the aim of returning Hispaniola, which now comprise the nations of the Dominican Republic and Haiti, back to Spanish rule.
 Antonio de los Reyes Correa, Captain, Spanish Army; Puerto Rican hero who defended the town Arecibo in 1702 from an invasion by defeating the British; was awarded La Medalla de Oro de la Real Efigie (The Gold Medal of the Royal Image), by King Philip V of Spain and given the title "Captain of Infantry"
 José and Francisco Díaz, Sergeants, Puerto Rican militia;  cousins in the Toa Baja Militia who helped defeat Sir Ralph Abercromby and defend Puerto Rico from a British invasion in 1797
 Miguel Henríquez, Captain, Spanish Navy; in 1713, defeated the British in Vieques and was awarded the La Medalla de Oro de la Real Efigie (The Gold Medal of the Royal Effigy)

19th century
 Ramón Acha Caamaño, Brigadier General, Spanish Army; defended the city of San Juan against the U.S. attack of Puerto Rico during the Spanish–American War; awarded the Cruz de la Orden de Merito Naval 1ra clase (The Cross of the Order of the Naval Merit 1st class) by the Spanish government for his role in the rescue of the cargo of the Spanish transoceanic steamer SS Antonio López
 Juan Alonso Zayas, 2nd Lieutenant, Spanish Army; commander of the 2nd Expeditionary Battalion of the Spanish Army stationed in Baler which fought in the Siege of Baler in the Philippines
 Francisco Gonzalo Marín, Lieutenant, Cuban Liberation Army; considered by many as the designer of the Puerto Rican flag; a poet and journalist; fought alongside José Martí for Cuba's independence
 Demetrio O'Daly, first Puerto Rican to reach the rank of Field Marshal in the Spanish Army; first Puerto Rican to be awarded the Cruz Laureada de San Fernando (Laureate Cross of Saint Ferdinand – Spain's version of the Medal of Honor); elected as delegate to the Spanish Courts in representation of Puerto Rico
 Luis Padial, Brigadier General, Spanish Army; in 1863, his battalion was deployed with the intention of "squashing" a pro-independence rebellion in the Dominican Republic, in which he was wounded; played an essential role in the abolishment of slavery in Puerto Rico
 Ramón Power y Giralt, Captain, Spanish Navy; distinguished naval officer who from 1808 to 1809 led the defense of the Spanish Colony of Santo Domingo (Dominican Republic) against an invasion from Napoleon's French forces by enforcing a blockade in support of the Spanish ground troops
 Ángel Rivero Méndez, Captain, Spanish Army; fired the first shot against the United States in the Spanish–American War in Puerto Rico; later invented Kola Champagne, a soft drink
 Juan Ríus Rivera, Commander-in-Chief of the Cuban Liberation Army; fought in El Grito de Lares under the command of Mathias Brugman; fought in Cuba's Ten Years' War (1868–1878) against Spain under the command of General Máximo Gómez and became the General of the Cuban Liberation Army of the West upon the death of General Antonio Maceo Grajales
 Augusto Rodríguez, Lieutenant, United States Union Army; member of the 15th Connecticut Regiment (a.k.a. Lyon Regiment); served in the defenses of Washington, D.C.; led his men in the Battles of Fredericksburg and Wyse Fork in the American Civil War
 Manuel Rojas, Commander in Chief of the Puerto Rican Liberation Army; on September 28, 1868, he led 800 men and women in a revolt against Spanish rule and took the town of Lares in the Grito de Lares
 José Semidei Rodríguez, Brigadier General, Cuban Liberation Army; fought in Cuba's War of Independence (1895–1898); after Cuba gained its independence he continued to serve there as a diplomat
 Antonio Valero de Bernabé, Brigadier General in the Latin American wars of independence; fought against the forces of Napoleon Bonaparte at the Siege of Saragossa; joined the Mexican Revolutionary Army headed by Agustín de Iturbide and was named Chief of Staff; successfully fought for Mexico's independence from Spain; fought alongside Simón Bolívar and helped liberate South America from Spanish Colonial rule; known as the "Puerto Rican Liberator"

20th century
 Ricardo Aponte, Brigadier General, U.S. Air Force; fighter pilot in F-111s, politico-military affairs, former Director of the Innovation and Experimentation Directorate, United States Southern Command; first Puerto Rican to hold this position
 Janet Álvarez González, Major, Public Affairs Officer, Texas Military Forces; first Puerto Rican to receive the Texas Medal of Merit for Outstanding Service to the Texas Military Forces, awarded 2010 in Camp Mabry Austin, Texas.
 Félix Arenas Gaspar, Captain, Spanish Army; posthumously awarded the Cruz Laureada de San Fernando (Laureate Cross of Saint Ferdinand – Spain's version of the Medal of Honor) for his actions in the Rif War
 Joseph (José) B. Aviles Sr., CWO2, U.S. Coast Guard; on September 28, 1925, became the first Hispanic Chief Petty Officer in the United States Coast Guard; during World War II received a wartime promotion to Chief Warrant Officer, becoming the first Hispanic to reach that level as well
 Carlos Betances Ramírez, Colonel, U.S. Army; first Puerto Rican to command a battalion in the Korean War; in 1952, he assumed the command of the 2nd Battalion, 65th Infantry Regiment
 Richard Carmona, Vice Admiral, Public Health Service Commissioned Corps; served as the 17th Surgeon General of the United States under President George W. Bush
 Modesto Cartagena, Sergeant First Class, U.S. Army; the most decorated Hispanic soldier in history; distinguished himself in combat during the Korean War as a member of Puerto Rico's 65th Infantry and is being considered for the Medal of Honor
 Carlos Fernando Chardón, Major General, Puerto Rico National Guard; Secretary of State of Puerto Rico 1969–73; Puerto Rico Adjutant General 1973–75
 Felix M. Conde-Falcon, Staff Sergeant, U.S. Army; received the Medal of Honor posthumously on March 18, 2014, for his courageous actions while serving as an acting Platoon Leader in Company D, 1st Battalion, 505th Infantry Regiment, 3d Brigade, 82d Airborne Division during combat operations against an armed enemy in Ap Tan Hoa, Republic of Vietnam on April 4, 1969
 Carmen Contreras-Bozak, Tech4, U.S. Women's Army Corps; first Hispanic to serve in the U.S. Women's Army Corps; served as an interpreter and in numerous administrative positions during World War II
 Virgilio N. Cordero Jr., Brigadier General, U.S. Army; a Battalion Commander of the 31st Infantry Regiment who documented his experiences as a prisoner of war and his participation in the infamous Bataan Death March of World War II.
 Juan César Cordero Dávila, Major General, U.S. Army; commanding officer of the 65th Infantry Regiment during the Korean War, thus becoming one of the highest ranking ethnic officers in the Army
 Encarnación Correa, Sergeant, U.S. Army; the person who fired the first warning shots in World War I on behalf of the United States against a ship flying the colors of the Central Powers, when on March 21, 1915, under the orders of then-Lieutenant Teófilo Marxuach, he manned a machine gun and opened fire on the Odenwald, an armed German supply ship trying to force its way out of the San Juan Bay
 Ruben A. Cubero, Brigadier General U.S. Air Force; of Puerto Rican descent; highly decorated member of the United States Air Force; in 1991 became the first Hispanic graduate of the United States Air Force Academy to be named Dean of the Faculty of the Academy
 Pedro del Valle, Lieutenant General, U.S. Marine Corps; first Hispanic three-star Marine general; his military career included service in World War I, Haiti and Nicaragua during the so-called Banana Wars of the 1920s, and in the seizure of Guadalcanal and later as Commanding General of the U.S. 1st Marine Division during World War II played an instrumental role in the defeat of the Japanese forces in Okinawa
 Carmelo Delgado Delgado, Lieutenant, Abraham Lincoln International Brigade; first Puerto Rican and one of the first U.S. citizens to fight and to die in the Spanish Civil War against General Francisco Franco and the Spanish Nationalists
 Alberto Díaz Jr., Rear Admiral, U.S. Navy; first Hispanic to become the Director of the San Diego Naval Medical District
 Luis R. Esteves, Major General, U.S. Army; in 1915, became the first Puerto Rican and therefore the first Hispanic to graduate from the United States Military Academy; organized the Puerto Rican National Guard
 Salvador E. Felices, Major General, U.S. Air Force; first Puerto Rican general in the U.S. Air Force; in 1953, he flew in 19 combat missions over North Korea during the Korean War; in 1957, he participated in a historic project that was given to Fifteenth Air Force by the Strategic Air Command headquarters known as "Operation Power Flite", the first around the world non-stop flight by all-jet aircraft
 Michelle Fraley (née Hernández), Colonel, U.S. Army; became in 1984 the first Puerto Rican woman to graduate from West Point Military Academy; former chief of staff of the Army Network Enterprise Technology Command
 Rose Franco, CWO3, U.S. Marine Corps; first female Hispanic Chief Warrant Officer in the Marine Corps; in 1965 was named Administrative Assistant to the Secretary of the Navy, Paul Henry Nitze by the administration of President Lyndon B. Johnson
 Edmund Ernest García, Rear Admiral, U.S. Navy; during World War II he was commander of the destroyer  and saw action in the invasions of Africa, Sicily, and France
 Fernando Luis García, Private First Class, U.S. Marine Corps; first Puerto Rican awarded the Medal of Honor; posthumously awarded the medal for his actions against enemy aggressor forces in the Korean War on September 5, 1952.
 Linda Garcia Cubero, Captain, U.S. Air Force; of Mexican-Puerto Rican heritage; in 1980 became the first female Hispanic graduate of any of the U.S. military academies when she graduated from the United States Air Force Academy
 Carmen García Rosado, Private First Class, U.S. Women's Army Corps; was among the first 200 Puerto Rican women to be recruited into the WAC's during World War II; author of Las WACS-Participacion de la Mujer Boricua en la Segunda Guerra Mundial (The WACs – The participation of the Puerto Rican women in the Second World War), the first book which documents the experiences of the first 200 Puerto Rican women to participate in said conflict as members of the armed forces of the United States
 Mihiel Gilormini, Brigadier General, U.S. Air Force; World War II hero, recipient of 5 Distinguished Flying Crosses; together with Brig. General Alberto A. Nido and Lt. Col. Jose Antonio Muñiz, founded the Puerto Rico Air National Guard; previously flew for the Royal Canadian Air Force (1941) and the Royal Air Force (1941–1942)
 Manuel Goded Llopis, General, Spanish Army; a Puerto Rican in the Spanish Army; one of the first generales to join General Francisco Franco in the revolt against the Spanish Republican government (also known as Spanish loyalists) in the Spanish Civil War; previously distinguished himself in the Battle of Alhucemas of the Rif War
 César Luis González, First Lieutenant, U.S. Army Air Force; first Puerto Rican pilot in the United States Army Air Force; first Puerto Rican pilot to die in World War II.
 Diego E. Hernández, Vice Admiral, U.S. Navy; first Hispanic to be named Vice Commander, North American Aerospace Defense Command; flew two combat tours in Vietnam during the Vietnam War; in 1980, took command of the aircraft carrier 
 Haydee Javier Kimmich, Captain, U.S. Navy; highest ranking Hispanic female in the Navy; Chief of Orthopedics at the Navy Medical Center in Bethesda and she reorganized Reservist Department of the medical center during Operations Desert Shield and Desert Storm
 Orlando Llenza, Major General, U.S. Air Force; second Puerto Rican to reach the rank of Major General (two-star General) in the United States Air Force; Adjutant General of the Puerto Rico National Guard
 Carlos Lozada, Private First Class, U.S. Army; posthumously awarded the Medal of Honor for his actions on November 20, 1967, at Dak To in the Republic of Vietnam
 Carmen Lozano Dumler, 2nd Lieutenant, U.S. Women's Army Corps; one of the first Puerto Rican women Army officers; in 1944, she was sworn in as a 2nd Lieutenant and assigned to the 161st General Hospital in San Juan
 Antonio Maldonado, Brigadier General, U.S. Air Force; in 1965, became the youngest person to pilot a B-52 aircraft; his active participation in the Vietnam War included 183 air combat missions
 Joseph (José) R. Martínez, Private First Class, U.S. Army; destroyed a German Infantry unit and tank in Tuniz by providing heavy artillery fire, saving his platoon from being attacked in the process; received the Distinguished Service Cross from General George S. Patton, becoming the first Puerto Rican recipient of said military decoration
 Lester Martínez López, MPH, Major General, U.S. Army; first Hispanic to head the Army Medical and Research Command
 Gilberto José Marxuach, Colonel, U.S. Army
 Teófilo Marxuach, Lieutenant Colonel, U.S. Army; fired a hostile shot from a cannon located at the Santa Rosa battery of El Morro fort, in what is considered to be the first shot of World War I fired by the regular armed forces of the United States against any ship flying the colors of the Central Powers, forcing the Odenwald to stop and to return to port where its supplies were confiscated
 Angel Mendez, Sergeant, U.S. Marine Corps; of Puerto Rican descent; was awarded the Navy Cross in Vietnam and is being considered for the Medal of Honor; saved the life of his lieutenant, Ronald D. Castille, who went on to become the Chief Justice of the Supreme Court of Pennsylvania
 Enrique Méndez Jr., Major General, U.S. Army; first Puerto Rican to assume the positions of Army Deputy Surgeon General, Commander of the Walter Reed Army Medical Center and Assistant Secretary of Defense for Health Affairs
 Virgil R. Miller, Colonel, U.S. Army; Regimental Commander of the 442d Regimental Combat Team (RCT), a unit which was composed of "Nisei" (second generation Americans of Japanese descent), during World War II; led the 442nd in its rescue of the Lost Texas Battalion of the 36th Infantry Division, in the forests of the Vosges Mountains in northeastern France
 José Antonio Muñiz Lieutenant Colonel, U.S. Air Force; together with then-Colonels Alberto A. Nido and Mihiel Gilormini, founded the Puerto Rico Air National Guard; in 1963, the Air National Guard Base, at the San Juan International airport in Puerto Rico, was renamed "Muñiz Air National Guard Base" in his honor
 William A. Navas Jr., Major General, U.S. Army; first Puerto Rican named Assistant Secretary of the Navy; a veteran of the Vietnam War; nominated in 2001 by President George W. Bush to serve as the Assistant Secretary of the Navy (Manpower and Reserve Affairs)
 Juan E. Negrón, Master Sergeant, U.S. Army; received the Medal of Honor posthumously on March 18, 2014, for courageous actions while serving as a member of Company L, 65th Infantry Regiment, 3d Infantry Division during combat operations against an armed enemy in Kalma-Eri, Korea, on April 28, 1951
 Héctor Andrés Negroni, Colonel, U.S. Air Force; first Puerto Rican graduate of the United States Air Force Academy; a veteran of the Vietnam War; was awarded the Aeronautical Merit Cross, Spai'ns highest Air Force peacetime award for his contributions to the successful implementation of the United States-Spain Treaty of Friendship and Cooperation
 Alberto A. Nido, Brigadier General, U.S. Air Force; a World War II war hero who together with Lt. Col. Jose Antonio Muñiz, co-founded the Puerto Rico Air National Guard and served as its commander for many years; served in the Royal Canadian Air Force, the British Royal Air Force and in the United States Army Air Forces during World War II
 Jorge Otero Barreto, Sergeant First Class, U.S. Army; with 38 decorations, which includes 3 Silver Star Medals, 5 Bronze Star Medals with Valor, 4 Army Commendation medals, 5 Purple Heart Medals and 5 Air Medals, has been called the most decorated U.S. soldier of the Vietnam War
 Dolores Piñero, U.S. Army Medical Corps; despite the fact that she was not an active member of the military, she was the first Puerto Rican woman doctor to serve in the Army under contract during World War I; at first she was turned down, but after writing a letter to the Army Surgeon General in Washington, D.C. she was ordered to report to Camp Las Casas in Santurce, Puerto Rico; in October 1918, she signed her contract with the Army.
 José M. Portela, Brigadier General U.S. Air Force; served in the position of Assistant Adjutant General for Air while also serving as commander of the Puerto Rico Air National Guard; in 1972,  became the youngest C-141 Starlifter aircraft commander and captain at age 22; the only reservist ever to serve as director of mobility forces for Bosnia
 Marion Frederic Ramírez de Arellano, Captain, U.S. Navy; first Hispanic submarine commander; awarded two Silver Stars and a Bronze Star for his actions against the Japanese Imperial Navy during World War II
 Antonio J. Ramos, Brigadier General, U.S. Air Force; first Hispanic to serve as commander, Air Force Security Assistance Center, Air Force Materiel Command, and dual-hatted as Assistant to the Commander for International Affairs, Headquarters Air Force Materiel Command
 Agustín Ramos Calero, Sergeant First Class, U.S. Army; with 22 military decorations, was the most decorated soldier in all of the United States during World War II
 Fernando L. Ribas-Dominicci, Major, U.S. Air Force; one of the pilots who participated in the Libyan air raid as member of the 48th Tactical Fighter Wing; his F-111F was shot down in action over the disputed Gulf of Sidra off the Libyan coast. Ribas-Dominicci and his weapons systems officer, Capt. Paul Lorence, were the only U.S. casualties of Operation El Dorado Canyon
 Frederick Lois Riefkohl, Rear Admiral, U.S. Navy; born Luis Federico Riefkohl Jaimieson; one of the first Puerto Ricans to graduate from the United States Naval Academy; in World War I became the first Puerto Rican to be awarded the Navy Cross
 Rudolph W. Riefkohl, Colonel, U.S. Army; played an instrumental role in helping the people of Poland overcome the 1919 typhus epidemic
 Demensio Rivera, Private, U.S. Army; received the Medal of Honor posthumously on March 18, 2014, for his courageous actions while serving as an automatic rifleman with 2d Platoon, Company G, 7th Infantry Regiment, 3d Infantry Division during combat operations against an armed enemy in Changyong-ni, Korea on May 23, 1951
 Manuel Rivera Jr., Captain, U.S. Marine Corps; of Puerto Rican descent; first U.S. serviceman to die in Operation Desert Shield
 Pedro N. Rivera, Brigadier General, U.S. Air Force; in 1994, became the first Hispanic to be named medical commander in the Air Force; responsible for the provision of health care to more than 50,000 patients
 Horacio Rivero, Admiral, U.S. Navy; in 1964, became the first Puerto Rican and second Hispanic Admiral (four-star) in the U.S. Navy; participated in World War II, Korean War, and Vietnam War; commander in 1962 of the American fleet sent by President John F. Kennedy during the Cuban Missile Crisis to set up a quarantine (blockade) of the Soviet ships in an effort to stop the Cold War from escalating into World War III
 Pedro Rodríguez, Master Sergeant, U.S. Army; member of Puerto Rico's 65th Infantry; earned two Silver Stars within a seven-day period during the Korean War
 Antonio Rodríguez Balinas, Brigadier General, U.S. Army; first commander of the Office of the First U.S. Army Deputy Command; during the Korean War he fought with Puerto Rico's 65th Infantry Regiment and was awarded the Silver Star
 Fernando E. Rodríguez Vargas, Major, U.S. Army; odontologist (dentist), scientist and a Major in the U.S. Army who in 1921 discovered the bacteria which causes dental caries
 Eurípides Rubio, Captain, U.S. Army; posthumously awarded the Medal of Honor for his actions at Tây Ninh Province in the Republic of Vietnam on November 8, 1966
 Héctor Santiago-Colón, Specialist Four, U.S. Army; posthumously awarded the Medal of Honor for his actions at Quảng Trị Province, Vietnam as member of Company B of the 5th Battalion, 7th Cavalry, 1st Cavalry Division
 Antulio Segarra, Colonel, U.S. Army; in 1943, became the first Puerto Rican Regular Army officer to command a Regular Army Regiment when he assumed the command of Puerto Rico's 65th Infantry Regiment, which was conducting security missions in the jungles of Panama
 Miguel A. Vera, Private, U.S. Army; was awarded the Medal of Honor posthumously for his courageous actions while serving as an automatic rifleman with Company F, 38th Infantry Regiment, 2d Infantry Division in Chorwon, Korea, on September 21, 1952
 Humbert Roque Versace, Captain, U.S. Army; of Italian and Puerto Rican descent; posthumously awarded the Medal of Honor for his heroic actions while a prisoner of war (POW) during the Vietnam War; first member of the U.S. Army to be awarded the Medal of Honor for actions performed in Southeast Asia while in captivity
 Raúl G. Villaronga, Colonel, U.S. Army; first Puerto Rican to be elected as Mayor of a Texas city (Killeen)

21st century
 Marta Carcana, Major General, U.S. Army; in 2015, became the first woman to be named Adjutant General of the Puerto Rican National Guard
 Iván Castro, Captain, U.S. Army; of Puerto Rican descent; one of three blind active-duty officers who serves in the US Army; the only blind officer serving in the United States Army Special Forces
 Hilda I. Ortiz Clayton, Specialist, U.S. Army, was a combat photographer killed in 2013 when a mortar exploded during an Afghan training exercise; she was able to photograph the explosion that killed her and four Afghan soldiers. The 55th Signal Company named their annual competitive award for combat camera work "The Spc. Hilda I. Clayton Best Combat Camera (COMCAM) Competition" in her honor.
 Ramón Colón-López, Senior Enlisted Advisor to the Chairman, U.S. Air Force; a pararescueman; on June 13, 2007, was the first and only Hispanic among the first six airmen to be awarded the Air Force Combat Action Medal; Commandant of the Pararescue and Combat Rescue Officer School
 Olga E. Custodio, Lieutenant Colonel, U.S. Air Force; first female Hispanic U.S. military pilot; first Latina to complete U.S. Air Force military pilot training; after retiring, became the first Latina commercial airline captain
 Emilio Díaz Colón, Major General, U.S. Army; PRNG; first Superintendent of the Puerto Rican Police; served as the Adjutant General of the Puerto Rican National Guard
 Rafael O'Ferrall, Brigadier General, U.S. Army; first Hispanic and person of Puerto Rican descent to become the Deputy Commanding General for the Joint Task Force at Guantanamo, Cuba while simultaneously serving as Assistant Adjutant General (Army) and Deputy Commanding General of the Joint Force Headquarters at San Juan, Puerto Rico
 María Inés Ortiz, Captain, U.S. Army; of Puerto Rican descent; first United States Army nurse to die in combat during Operation Iraqi Freedom and the first to die in combat since the Vietnam War
 Hector E. Pagan, Brigadier General, U.S. Army; first Hispanic of Puerto Rican descent to become Deputy Commanding General of the U.S. Army John F. Kennedy Special Warfare Center and School at Fort Bragg, North Carolina
 Maritza Sáenz Ryan, Colonel, U.S. Army; of Puerto Ricana and Spanish descent; head of the Department of Law at the United States Military Academy; first woman and first Hispanic (Puerto Rican and Spanish heritage) West Point graduate to serve as an academic department head; the most senior ranking Hispanic Judge Advocate
 Marc H. Sasseville, Major General, U.S. Air Force; Puerto Rican mother; on September 11, 2001, was acting operations group commander under the 113th Wing of the DC Air National Guard; one of four fighter pilots commissioned with finding and destroying United Flight 93 by any means necessary, including ramming the aircraft in midair
 Noel Zamot, Colonel, U.S. Air Force, a native of Rio Piedras, was the first Hispanic commandant of the Air Force's elite Test Pilot School. He is also a former combat and test aviator with over 1900 hours in B-52, B-1B, B-2A, F-16D and over 20 other aircraft.
 Irene M. Zoppi, Brigadier General, U.S. Army; first Puerto Rican woman to reach the rank of Brigadier General in the United States Army; Deputy Commanding General – Support under the 200th Military Police Command at Fort Meade, Maryland; Bronze Star Medal recipient

Physicians, scientists and inventors
     
 Joseph M. Acaba, scientist, educator, first Puerto Rican astronaut
 Carlos Albizu Miranda, psychologist; first Hispanic educator to have a North American university renamed in his honor; one of the first Hispanics to earn a PhD in psychology in the U.S.
 Ricardo Alegría, anthropologist, archaeologist and educator; "father of modern Puerto Rican archaeology"
 Jorge N. Amely Vélez, electrical engineer and inventor; holds various patents in the field of medical technology
 Bailey K. Ashford, author, physician, soldier, and parasitologist; Colonel in the U.S. Army, arrived in Puerto Rico during the Spanish–American War and made the island his home; organized and conducted a parasite treatment campaign which cured approximately 300,000 people (one-third of the Puerto Rico population) and reduced the death rate from this anemia by 90 percent
 Pedro Beauchamp, surgeon; first Puerto Rican specialist certified by the American Reproductive Endocrinology and Infertility Board; performed the first in vitro fertilization technique on the island in 1985
 Víctor Manuel Blanco, astronomer; in 1959, discovered a "Blanco 1", a galactic cluster; second Director of the Cerro Tololo Inter-American Observatory in Chile, which has the largest 4-m telescope in the Southern Hemisphere; in 1995, the telescope was dedicated in his honor as the "Víctor M. Blanco Telescope", also known as the "Blanco 4m"
 Rafael L. Bras, former chair of Civil Engineering at MIT; leading expert on hydrometeorology and global warming
 Anthony M. Busquets, electronic engineer, aerospace technologist; involved in the development and application of multifunction control/display switch technology in 1983 and development and application of a microprocessor-based I/O system for simulator use in 1984
 Carlos E. Chardón, a.k.a. the "father of mycology in Puerto Rico"; first Puerto Rican mycologist; discovered the aphid "Aphis maidis", the vector of the mosaic of sugar cane, in 1922; author of the Chardón Plan; first Puerto Rican to hold the position of Chancellor of the University of Puerto Rico
 Nitza Margarita Cintron, scientist; Chief of NASA's (JSC) Space and Health Care Systems Office
 Pablo Clemente-Colon, first Puerto Rican Chief Scientist of the National Ice Center (2005–present)
 Antonia Coello Novello, physician; first Hispanic and first woman U.S. Surgeon General (1990–93)
 Martín Corchado (born 1839), physician, medical researcher, and president of the Autonomist Party of Puerto Rico
 José F. Cordero, pediatrician; founding director of the National Center on Birth Defects and Developmental Disabilities at the Centers for Disease Control and Prevention
 Milagros J. Cordero, pediatrician; founder and President of Team Therapy Services For Children
 María Cordero Hardy, physiologist, educator and scientist; did important research on vitamin E
 Juan R. Correa-Pérez, scientist; first clinical andrologist and embryologist in Puerto Rico
 Juan R. Cruz, NASA scientist, played an instrumental role in the design and development of the Mars Exploration Rover parachute
 Carlos Del Castillo, NASA scientist; Program Scientist for the Ocean Biology and Biogeochemistry Program at NASA; recipient of the Presidential Early Career Award for Scientists and Engineers award, the highest honor bestowed by the U.S. government on scientists and engineers beginning their independent careers
 Manuel de la Pila Iglesias, multi-faceted physician; introduced the first EKG and X-ray machines into Puerto Rico; founded a medical clinic which today houses a respected medical center in Ponce
 Alfonso Eaton, mechanical engineer, aerospace technologist; first Puerto Rican to work for NASA
 Enectalí Figueroa-Feliciano, astronaut applicant and astrophysicist with NASA; pioneered the development of position-sensitive detectors
 Orlando Figueroa, mechanical engineer at NASA; former Director for Mars Exploration and the Director for the Solar System Division in the Office of Space Science; now Director, Applied Engineering & Technology at the NASA, Goddard Space Flight Center; as Director of Engineering he manages the full scope of engineering activities at Goddard
 Adolfo Figueroa-Viñas, first Puerto Rican astrophysicist at NASA working in solar plasma physics; senior research scientist; involved in many NASA missions such as Wind, SOHO, Cluster and MMS projects
 José N. Gándara, lead physician attending to the wounded of the Ponce massacre and later an expert witness at the trials of the "Nacionalistas" as well as before the Hays Commission; held numerous government positions, including Secretary of Health of Puerto Rico; co-founded the Popular Democratic Party of Puerto Rico
 Joxel García, first Puerto Rican Assistant Secretary for Health, U.S. Department of Health and Human Services; Admiral in the United States Public Health Service Commissioned Corps
 Mario García Palmieri, cardiologist; first Hispanic to be designated a "Master" by the American College of Cardiology
 Sixto González, scientist; first Puerto Rican Director of the Arecibo Observatory, with the world's largest single dish radio telescope
 Rosa A. González, registered nurse; founded the Association of Registered Nurses of Puerto Rico; wrote various books related to her field in which she denounced the discrimination against women and nurses in Puerto Rico
 Isaac González Martínez, urologist; first Puerto Rican urologist; pioneer in the fight against cancer in the island
 Olga D. González-Sanabria, NASA engineer; highest ranking Hispanic at NASA Glenn Research Center; member of the Ohio Women's Hall of Fame
 Amri Hernández-Pellerano, NASA engineer; designs, builds and tests the electronics that regulate the solar array power at NASA's Goddard Space Flight Center
 Gloria Hernandez, physical scientist, aerospace technologist; Science Manager for the Stratospheric Aerosol and Gas Experiment at NASA Langley Research Center; her supersonic aerodynamic research has resulted in economic advances in supersonic flight
 Lucas G. Hortas, aerospace engineer and technologist; author and or co-author of over 35 technical papers
 Chris Kubecka (full name Christina Kubecka de Medina), a Computer Scientist specialist in cyberwarfare, established international business operations for Saudi Aramco after the world's most devastating Shamoon cyber warfare attacks. Detected and helped halt the second wave of July 2009 cyberattacks cyberwar attacks against South Korea.
 Ramón E. López, physicist; professor in the Department of Physics at the University of Texas at Arlington; Fellow of the American Physical Society; recipient of the 2002 Nicholson Medal for Humanitarian Service; co-authored a book on space weather, Storms from the Sun
 Fernando López Tuero, agricultural scientist and agronomist; discovered the bug (believed at first to be a germ) which was destroying Puerto Rico's sugar canes
 Carlos A. Liceaga, electronic engineer, aerospace technologist; leads the development of proposal guidelines, and the technical, management, and cost evaluation of the proposals For the Explorer Program
 Ariel Lugo, scientist and ecologist; Director of the International Institute of Tropical Forestry in the U.S. Department of Agriculture Forest Service, based in Puerto Rico; founding member of the Society for Ecological Restoration; member-at-large of the Board of the Ecological Society of America
 Melissa Cristina Márquez, "Mother of Sharks," marine biologist, author, and science communicator
Debbie Martínez, computer engineer, aerospace technologist; Flight Systems and Software Branch software manager for the Cockpit Motion Facility at NASA Langley Research Center
 Lissette Martinez, electronic engineer, rocket scientist; lead electrical engineer for the Space Experiment Module program at NASA's Wallops Flight Facility
 Manuel Martínez Maldonado, nephrologist, educator; author of numerous scientific publications; discovered a natriuretic hormone
 Antonio Mignucci, marine biologist, oceanographer; founder of "Red Caribeña de Varamientos"
 Carlos Ortiz Longo, NASA engineer and scientist, and pilot
 Joseph O. Prewitt Díaz, psychologist; specialized in psychosocial theory; recipient of the American Psychological Association's 2008 International Humanitarian Award
 Mercedes Reaves, research engineer and scientist; responsible for the design of a viable full-scale solar sail and the development and testing of a scale model solar sail at NASA Langley Research Center
 Ron Rivera, inventor and workshop organizer; invented life-saving water filters based on pottery
 Juan A. Rivero, scientist and educator; founded the Dr. Juan A. Rivero Zoo in Mayagüez, has discovered numerous animal species; author of several books
 Miriam Rodon-Naveira, NASA scientist; first Hispanic woman to hold the Deputy Directorship for the Environmental Sciences Division in the National Exposure Research Laboratory
 Miguel Rodríguez, mechanical engineer; Chief of the Integration Office of the Cape Canaveral Spaceport Management Office
 Pedro Rodriguez, inventor, mechanical engineer; director of a test laboratory at NASA; invented a portable, battery-operated lift seat for people suffering from knee arthritis
 Helen Rodriguez-Trias, physician and activist; first Latina president of the American Public Health Association; a founding member of the Women's Caucus of the American Public Health Association; recipient of the Presidential Citizen's Medal
 Fernando E. Rodríguez Vargas, dental scientist; discovered the bacteria which causes dental cavities
 Monserrate Roman, scientist, microbiologist; helped build the International Space Station
 Gualberto Ruaño, biotechnology pioneer and founder of Genomas, Inc.; pioneer in the field of personalized medicine; inventor of a system used worldwide for the management of viral diseases; President and founder of Genomas, a genetics-related company; director of genetics research at Hartford Hospital's Genetic Research Center
 José Francisco Salgado, Emmy-nominated astronomer, visual artist, and science communicator; former astronomer at the Adler Planetarium in Chicago; member of the audiovisual ensemble Bailey-Salgado Project
 Ulises Armand Sanabria, of Puerto Rican and French descent; developed mechanical televisions and early terrestrial television broadcasts
 Eduardo Santiago Delpín, surgeon; wrote the first book in Spanish about organ transplants
 Yajaira Sierra Sastre, astronaut; part of a NASA project on astronaut nutrition and health; She will live for four months isolated in a planetary module at a base in Hawaii to simulate life at a future base on Mars
 Diego R. Solís, physician; performed the first simultaneous pancreas and kidney transplant in Puerto Rico
 Félix Soto Toro, electrical engineer, astronaut applicant; developed the Advanced Payload Transfer Measurement System (ASPTMS), an electronic 3D measuring system
 Agustín Stahl, scientist in the fields of botany, ethnology and zoology
 Ramón M. Suárez Calderon, scientist, cardiologist, educator and hematologist; his investigations led to the identification of the proper and effective treatment of a type of anemia known as Tropical Espru, the application of complex methods, such as electrocardiography and radioisotope, to be used in clinics and the identification and treatment of the disease which causes heart rheumatism
 Fermín Tangüis, scientist, agriculturist and entrepreneur; developed the Tanguis cotton in Peru and saved that nation's cotton industry
 Dr. Neil deGrasse Tyson, astrophysicist, television and radio host; Puerto Rican mother; director of the Hayden Planetarium in New York City; host of the PBS series Cosmos: A Personal Voyage

Politicians

 

   

19th century
 Román Baldorioty de Castro, "the father of Puerto Rico's autonomy"
 José Celso Barbosa, "the father of Puerto Rico's statehood movement"
 Ramón Emeterio Betances y Alacán, "father of the Puerto Rican nation"; main leader of the Grito de Lares revolution
 Eugenio María de Hostos y Bonilla a.k.a. "El Gran Ciudadano de las Américas" (the Great Citizen of the Americas), educator, philosopher, intellectual, lawyer, sociologist, and independence advocate
 José M. Dávila Monsanto, senator, politician and lawyer; a co-founder of the Partido Popular Democrático de Puerto Rico
 José de Diego y Martínez, "the father of the Puerto Rican independence movement"; elected to the House of Delegates, the only locally elected body of government allowed by the U.S.; presided 1904–1917
 Federico Degetau, first resident commissioner to the U.S.
 José María Marxuach Echavarría, the only Puerto Rican to serve as the Mayor of San Juan under both Spanish and American rule; served in 1897 for the Liberal Reformista Party and 1900–01 for the Puerto Rican Republican Party
 Antonio Mattei Lluberas, leader of the second and last major revolt against Spanish colonial rule in Puerto Rico in the Intentona de Yauco of 1897; mayor of Yauco 1904–1906
 Rosendo Matienzo Cintrón,  political leader; in his early political career favored Puerto Rican statehood and later became an advocate for Puerto Rico's independence and founder of the Independence Party of Puerto Rico
 Luis Muñoz Rivera, former Resident Commissioner, journalist, politician (father of Luis Muñoz Marín)
 Ramón Power y Giralt, first Vice President of the Cortes of Cádiz (1810–1813)
 Francisco Mariano Quiñones, first president of Puerto Rico's Autonomic Cabinet
 Francisco Ramírez Medina, President of the Republic of Puerto Rico (September 23, 1868) during the Grito de Lares revolt
 Segundo Ruiz Belvis, leader of the Grito de Lares revolt
 Manuel Zeno Gandía, novelist and leader of cooperative movement in Puerto Rico

20th century
 Baltasar Corrada del Río, former Resident Commissioner 1977–1985; Mayor of San Juan 1985–1989; 1988 NPP gubernatorial candidate, Secretary of State 1992–1995; Supreme Court Justice 1995–2005
 Héctor Luis Acevedo; former Mayor of San Juan; 1996 PDP gubernatorial candidate
 Pedro Albizu Campos, President and principal leader of the Puerto Rican Nationalist Party
 José S. Alegría, poet, writer, lawyer and politician; a founding member of the Puerto Rican Nationalist Party and its president from 1928 to 1930
 Santos P. Amadeo, "champion of hábeas corpus"; former Senator in the Puerto Rico legislature
 María Luisa Arcelay, first woman in Puerto Rico elected to a government legislative body
 José Enrique Arrarás, politician, educator, attorney, public servant and sports leader
 Carmen E. Arroyo, first Puerto Rican woman elected to any state assembly, chair New York Hispanic Legislative Caucus
 Herman Badillo, first Puerto Rican to serve in U.S. Congress
 Joaquín Balaguer, former president of Dominican Republic (Puerto Rican father)
 Antonio R. Barceló, founder of the Puerto Rican Liberal Party; first president of the Senate of Puerto Rico.
 Josefina Barceló Bird de Romero (birth name: Maria Antonia Josefina Barceló Bird), elected president of the Liberal Party after her father died in 1938; first woman elected to lead a major political party in Puerto Rico
 Ángel O. Berríos, former Mayor of Caguas
 Rubén Berríos Martínez, President of the Puerto Rican Independence Party
 Juan Bosch, former president of Dominican Republic (Puerto Rican mother)
 Adolfo Carrión Jr., former Bronx (New York City) borough president
 Adam Clayton Powell IV, former member of the New York State Assembly
 Severo Colberg Ramírez, served as a member of the Puerto Rico House of Representatives, and was the Speaker from 1982 to 1985
 Gilberto Concepción de Gracia, founder of the Puerto Rican Independence Party
 Cayetano Coll y Cuchí, first President of Puerto Rico House of Representatives
 José Coll y Cuchí, founder of the Puerto Rican Nationalist Party
 Maria Colón Sánchez, activist and politician; in 1988, became the first Hispanic woman elected to the Connecticut General Assembly
 Rafael Cordero, former Mayor of Ponce
 Miguel del Valle, Illinois State Senator; first Latino City Clerk of Chicago; 2011 mayoral candidate
 Nelson Antonio Denis, former New York State Assemblyman
 Rubén Díaz, New York State Senator and religious leader
 Pedro Espada Jr., New York State Senator
 Antonio Fernós-Isern, first Puerto Rican cardiologist and Resident Commissioner
 Leopoldo Figueroa, co-founder of the Independence Association, one of three political organizations which merged to form the Puerto Rican Nationalist Party; changed political ideals and in 1948 was a member of the Partido Estadista Puertorriqueño (Puerto Rican Statehood Party); the only member of the Puerto Rico House of Representatives that year who did not belong to the Partido Popular Democrático (PPD), he opposed the PPD's approval of the bill that became the Ley de la Mordaza (Gag Law), which violated the civil rights of those who favor(ed) Puerto Rican independence
 Maurice Ferre, former Mayor of Miami, Florida
 Fernando Ferrer, former Bronx (New York City) borough president and New York City mayoral candidate
 Rogelio Figueroa, 2008 gubernatorial candidate and founder of Puerto Ricans for Puerto Rico Party
 Bonnie García, former California State Assemblywoman
 Robert Garcia, former New York State Assemblyman, State Senator and U.S. Representative
 Oscar García Rivera Sr., former New York State Assemblyman; in 1937 became the first Puerto Rican elected to public office in the continental U.S.; in 1956, became the first Puerto Rican to be nominated as the Republican candidate for Justice of the City Court
 Miguel A. García Méndez, youngest Speaker of the House in Puerto Rico's history; the Mayagüez General Post Office was named after him
 María Libertad Gómez Garriga, the only woman in the Constitutional Convention of Puerto Rico, formed in 1951; the only woman to sign the 1952 Constitution of Puerto Rico
 Luis Gutiérrez, United States Representative from Illinois
 Santiago Iglesias, founder of the first Puerto Rico Socialist Party, labor activist and former Resident Commissioner
 Margarita López, former New York City Council member and political activist
 Juan Francisco Luis, 24th governor of the United States Virgin Islands, 1978–1987
 Martin Malave Dilan, New York State Senator
 Evelyn Mantilla, member of Connecticut House of Representatives
 Juan Mari Brás, founder of the Movimiento Pro Independencia and the modern Puerto Rican Socialist Party
 Antonio "Tony" Méndez, first native-born Puerto Rican to become a district leader of a major political party in New York City
 Olga A. Méndez, first Puerto Rican New York State Senator
 Rosie Méndez, New York City councilwoman and activist
 Teodoro Moscoso, architect of Operation Bootstrap; former U.S. Ambassador to Venezuela (1961–1964)
 Victoria Muñoz Mendoza, 1992 PDP candidate for governor (daughter of Luis Muñoz Marín)
 Luis Muñoz Rivera, Senator; last surviving drafter of the Puerto Rico Constitution
 Félix Ortiz, New York State Assemblyman, author of nation's first cellphone driving ban
 George Pabey, Mayor of East Chicago, Indiana
 Hernán Padilla, former Mayor of San Juan, founder of the Puerto Rican Renewal Party
 Antonio Pagán, former New York City Council member
 Eddie Perez, former Mayor of Hartford, Connecticut
 María de Pérez Almiroty, first woman to be elected senator in Puerto Rico
 Samuel R. Quiñones, longest serving President of the Senate of Puerto Rico
 Ernesto Ramos Antonini, former Speaker of Puerto Rico's House of Representatives
 Charles Rangel, United States Congressman (Puerto Rican father)
 Roberto Rexach Benítez, former Senate President, educator; current columnist for the El Vocero newspaper
 Felisa Rincón de Gautier, first woman to be elected Mayor of a capital city in the Americas (Western Hemisphere)
 Ramón Luis Rivera, Mayor of Bayamón 1977–2001
 Samuel Rivera, Mayor of Passaic, New Jersey
 Manuela Santiago Collazo, Mayor of Vieques (1985–2000)
 Jorge Santini, former three-term Mayor of San Juan and Vice President of the New Progressive Party, former senator
 José E. Serrano, most senior Puerto Rican congressman, Chair of House Appropriations subcommittee on Financial Services
 Gloria Tristani, first Hispanic woman appointed as one of the commissioners of the Federal Communications Commission (FCC)
 Nydia Velázquez, first Puerto Rican congresswoman, Chair of House Small Business Committee
 Raúl G. Villaronga, first Puerto Rican elected mayor in Texas (Killeen)

21st century
Liston Bochette, Olympian and politician
 Richard Carmona, 17th Surgeon General of the United States
 Ruth Noemí Colón, 66th Secretary of State of New York
 Pedro Cortés, Pennsylvania's former Secretary of the Commonwealth; past President of National Association of Secretaries of State
 Lorraine Cortés-Vázquez, former Secretary of State of New York
 Rubén Díaz Jr., former New York State Assemblyman; Bronx Borough President (2009–present)
 Wilda Diaz, first female mayor of Perth Amboy, New Jersey; first Puerto Rican, first woman, and first Latino elected mayor in New Jersey
 Jenniffer González, former Speaker of the Puerto Rico House of Representatives
 Raúl Labrador, Congressman representing Idaho's 1st congressional district in the U.S. House of Representatives
 Saige Martin, Raleigh City Councilman
 Kenneth McClintock, 13th President of the Puerto Rico Senate; 22nd Secretary of State/Lieutenant Governor of Puerto Rico
 Hiram Monserrate, former New York State Senator
 Antonia Novello,14th Surgeon General of the U.S.; Vice Admiral, Public Health Service Commissioned Corps
 Alexandria Ocasio-Cortez, Democratic congresswoman for United States House of Representatives New York District 14
 Cesar A. Perales, 67th Secretary of State of New York
 Pedro Pierluisi, Governor of Puerto Rico (2021–present); de facto governor of Puerto Rico (2019); Secretary of Justice (1993–1997); Resident Commissioner (2009–2017)
 Roberto Prats, co-chair of winning Hillary Clinton primary campaign; Democratic State Chair; former senator and PDP congressional candidate
 John Quiñones, first Republican Party candidate of Puerto Rican ancestry elected to Florida House of Representatives
 Thomas Rivera Schatz, 14th President of the Senate of Puerto Rico
 Melinda Romero Donnelly, three-term at-large legislator, two terms in House, one in Senate Senate; Caribbean Business journalist
 Pedro Segarra, Mayor of Hartford, Connecticut
 Darren Soto, Representative in Florida House of Representatives, Florida Senate and the U.S. House of Representatives.
 Manuel A. Torres, Puerto Rico's first Electoral Comptroller, and longest serving modern Secretary of the Senate of Puerto Rico
 Daryl Vaz, Minister of Information and Telecommunication for Jamaica (Puerto Rican mother)

Sports
  

 

A
 Benjamin Agosto, figure skater and Olympic medalist (Puerto Rican father)
 Roberto Alomar, baseball player, MLB All-Star, third Puerto Rican inducted to the Baseball Hall of Fame (2011)
 Sandy Alomar Jr., baseball player
 Sandy Alomar Sr., baseball player
 Carmelo Anthony, NBA player, Los Angeles Lakers (Puerto Rican father)
 Orlando Antigua, in 1995, the first Hispanic and first non-black in 52 years to play for the Harlem Globetrotters (Puerto Rican mother)
 Chris Armas, soccer player (Puerto Rican mother)
 Carlos Arroyo (born 1979), former NBA player, member and captain of the Puerto Rican national basketball team
 Harry Arroyo, boxer, former IBF Lightweight Champion
 Nolan Arenado, baseball player, Colorado Rockies (Puerto Rican mother)
 Jake Arrieta, baseball player, Chicago Cubs (Puerto Rican grandfather)

B
 Javier Báez, baseball player, Detroit Tigers
 Juan Báez, former basketball player; recipient of Puerto Rico Olympic Medal of Honor
 José Juan Barea, NBA player, Dallas Mavericks; first Puerto Rican to play for winning team in the NBA Finals
 María Elena Batista, Olympic, PanAm and Central American games swimmer
 Bayley, WWE wrestler, real name Pamela Rose Martinez
 Eddie Belmonte, thoroughbred racing jockey
 Carlos Beltrán, baseball player, outfielder/designated hitter, Texas Rangers
 Wilfred Benítez, boxer, member of the International Boxing Hall of Fame
 David "Kike" Bernier, retired fencer, former Secretary of Sports and Recreation
 Hiram Bithorn, baseball player, first Puerto Rican in Major League Baseball
 Liston Bochette, Olympian and politician
 Devin Booker, NBA player, Phoenix Suns (Puerto Rican mother)
 Kristina Brandi, tennis player
 Isabel Bustamante, Paralympic athlete, first gold medalist for Puerto Rico at a Paralympic or Olympic games competition, gold at the 1988 Women's shot put 1B paralympic competition

C
 Iván Calderón, baseball player
 Iván Calderón, boxer, world champion
 Hector 'Macho' Camacho, boxer, former world champion and member of the International Boxing Hall of Fame
 Jasmine Camacho-Quinn, hurdles, won Puerto Rico's second Olympic Gold Medal in the Women's 100m Hurdles in the Olympic games which were celebrated in Tokyo, Japan.
 Fernando J. Canales, swimmer, first Puerto Rican to reach final championships
 Pedro Miguel Caratini, baseball player; born in Puerto Rico, "the father of Dominican baseball"
 Orlando Cepeda, baseball player, member of Baseball Hall of Fame
 Pedro Anibal Cepeda a.k.a. "Perucho" and "The Bull", baseball player; father of Orlando Cepeda; known as "the Babe Ruth of Puerto Rico"
 Nero Chen, Puerto Rico's first professional boxer
 Julie Chu, Olympic ice hockey player; forward on the U.S. women's ice hockey team; of Chinese and Puerto Rican descent
 Alex Cintrón, former professional baseball infielder and current hitting coach for the Houston Astros of Major League Baseball
 Conchita Cintrón, bullfighter (Puerto Rican father)
 Kermit Cintrón, boxer, former International Boxing Federation welterweight champion (2006–08)
 Roberto Clemente, 3,000-hit baseball player, first Puerto Rican member of Baseball Hall of Fame
 Rebekah Colberg, known as "the mother of Puerto Rican women's sports"; participated in various athletic competitions in the 1938 Central American and Caribbean Games in Panama, where she won gold medals in discus and javelin throw
 Carlitos Colon, former professional wrestler and member of the WWE Hall of Fame
 Carly Colón, professional wrestler
 Alex Cora, became the first Puerto Rican to manage a World Series winning team when the Boston Red Sox defeated the LA Dodgers in 2018.
 Ángel Cordero Jr., jockey, member of Jockey Hall of Fame
 Carlos Correa, first pick of the 2012 MLB Draft; 2015 AL Rookie of the Year
 Maritza Correia, first Afro-Puerto Rican female on the U.S. Olympic swimming team
 Joe Cortez, boxing referee; member of the International Boxing Hall of Fame
 Carla Cortijo, basketball player, first Puerto Rican-born woman to play in the WNBA; guard for the Atlanta Dream
 Miguel Cotto, professional boxer, former light welterweight, welterweight and junior middleweight world champion
 Eva Cruz, volleyball player
 José "Cheo" Cruz, baseball player whose number was retired by the Astros
 Orlando Cruz, boxer; first professional boxer to publicly announce he is gay
 Teófilo Cruz, basketball player
 Victor Cruz, NFL football player
 Javier Culson, Olympic athlete; bronze medalist; specialises in the 400 metre hurdles

D
 Christian Dalmau, BSN basketball player
 Raymond Dalmau, basketball player
 Carlos De León, first boxer to win cruiserweight world title four times
 Esteban De Jesús, boxer, former world champion
 Madeline de Jesús, athlete, runner short track, long-jump, triple jump, gold, silver and bronze medallist, participant in two Olympic Games
 Carlos Delgado, baseball player, New York Mets
 Edwin Díaz, baseball player, Seattle Mariners; by reaching his 50th strikeout in only 25 and a third innings, Díaz became the first pitcher to do so in at least 123 years

E
 Ivelisse Echevarría, inducted into the International Softball Federation Hall of Fame (2003)
 Alfredo Escalera, boxer, former world champion
 Alfredo L. Escalera, baseball player, youngest player ever drafted by an MLB organization; drafted in 2012 by the Kansas City Royals franchise
 Nino Escalera, baseball player, first Hispanic in the Cincinnati Reds franchise
 Sixto Escobar, boxer, first Puerto Rican world champion and member of the International Boxing Hall of Fame
 Ángel Espada, boxer, former champion

F
 Gigi Fernández, tennis player, in 1992 became the first female athlete from her native Puerto Rico win an Olympic gold medal; first female athlete from Puerto Rico to turn professional; first Puerto Rican woman inducted into the International Tennis Hall of Fame
 Lisa Fernandez, softball player, Olympic gold medalist (Puerto Rican mother)
 Orlando Fernández a.k.a. "the Puerto Rican Aquaman"; swimmer; first Puerto Rican to swim across the Strait of Gibraltar
 Ed Figueroa, baseball pitcher, first Puerto Rican to win 20 games in Major League
 Enrique Figueroa, sailing

G
 Rubén Gómez, first Puerto Rican to pitch and win a World Series game
 Wilfredo Gómez, boxer, former world champion; member of the International Boxing Hall of Fame
 Arístides González, boxer, first Olympic medalist under the flag of Puerto Rico, 1984 Summer Olympics
 Jorge González, marathon runner
 Juan González, baseball player

H
 Herbert Lewis Hardwick a.k.a. "Cocoa Kid", boxer, inducted into the International Boxing Hall of Fame in 2012
 Ivonne Harrison, track and field athlete
 Aaron Hernandez, NFL football player and former member of the New England Patriots
 Enrique Hernandez, baseball player, known colloquially as "Kiké"
 James Chico Hernandez, wrestling champion and member of the Latin-American Martial Arts Hall of Fame
 Laurie Hernandez, Olympic gold and silver medalist; member of the United States women's gymnastics team
 Ramón Hernández, baseball player

J
 Reggie Jackson, baseball player, member of Baseball Hall of Fame (Puerto Rican father)

K
 Julio Kaplan, chess International Master; former World Junior Chess Champion
 Konnan, professional wrestler
 Karrion Kross, professional wrestler, previously known as Killer Kross, real name Kevin Kesar

L
 Anita Lallande, former Olympic swimmer; holds the island record for most medals won at CAC Games: 17 and 10 gold
 AJ Lee, WWE Divas Champion
 Alfred Lee, basketball player; first Puerto Rican to play in NBA and to play on the NBA play-offs as a member of the 79-80 Los Angeles Lakers
 Angelita Lind, track and field athlete
 Francisco Lindor, baseball player, New York Mets
 Laura Daniela Lloreda, member of the Mexican national volleyball team
 Javy López, baseball player, Atlanta Braves
 Mike Lowell, baseball player, Boston Red Sox

M
 Felix Magath, German soccer star and coach (Puerto Rican father)
 Martín Maldonado, Major League Baseball catcher and Gold Glove Award winner 
 Mario Rivera Martino, Boxing sports writer and eventual commissioner. Member of the International Boxing Hall of Fame
 Edgar Martínez, former Major League Baseball player and fifth Puerto Rican member of Baseball Hall of Fame
 Denise Masino, bodybuilder
 Mark Medal, boxer, former IBF Light Middleweight Champion
 Orlando Melendez a.k.a. "El Gato", in 2008, became the first Puerto Rican-born basketball player to play for the Harlem Globetrotters
 Alberto Mercado, Olympian boxer
 Jerome Mincy, basketball player
 Bengie Molina, Major League Baseball catcher and Rawlings Gold Glove Award winner
 John John Molina, boxer, former world champion
 José Molina, Major League Baseball catcher
 Yadier Molina, Major League Baseball catcher, All-Star, and Rawlings Gold Glove Award winner
 David Monasterio, swimmer, member of the 1992 Olympic team for Puerto Rico
 Pedro Montañez, boxer and member of the International Boxing Hall of Fame
 Mario Morales, BSN basketball player
 Pedro Morales, wrestler, member of WWE Hall of Fame
 Jonny Moseley, skier, first Puerto Rican member of the U.S. ski team

N
 Emilio Navarro, first Puerto Rican to play in the Negro leagues

O
 Luis Olmo, first Puerto Rican to hit a home run in the World Series
 Fres Oquendo, professional boxer
 John Orozco, Olympic gymnast
 Carlos Ortiz, boxer, former, junior welterweight and lightweight champion; member of the International Boxing Hall of Fame
 José Ortiz, former basketball player, PDP candidate for elective office in 2008
 Luis Ortiz, boxer, first Puerto Rican to win a silver Olympic medal

P
 Raúl Papaleo, member of Puerto Rican national volleyball team
 Charlie Pasarell, tennis player
 Ernesto Pastor, bullfighter, only Puerto Rican member of the Bullfighting Hall of Fame
 Victor Pellot, a.k.a. "Vic Power", baseball player, second Afro-Puerto Rican in Major League Baseball
 Anthony "Tony" Perez, boxing referee and judge.
 Jorge Posada, baseball player, New York Yankees
 Damian Priest, WWE wrestler, real name Luis Martinez (Born in New York City to Puerto Rican parents, raised in Dorado, Puerto Rico)
 Monica Puig, tennis player; in the 2016 Olympics in Rio de Janeiro, won Puerto Rico's first-ever Olympic gold medal

Q
 Carlos Quintana, professional boxer, former World Boxing Organization's welterweight champion

R
 Peter John Ramos, former NBA and international basketball player
 Rico Ramos, professional boxer
 Héctor Ramos, professional football player, Puerto Rico national football team captain and top scorer
 Germán Rieckehoff, former president of Puerto Rican Olympic Committee
 Ramón Rivas, NBA and International basketball player
 Antonio Rivera, boxer, a.k.a. "El Gallo"; WBA Super Welterweight Champion
 Filiberto Rivera, former UTEP star point guard and former point guard on Puerto Rico national basketball team
 Jorge Rivera, mixed martial artist
 Neftalí Rivera, basketball player, record holder for most points scored in a game in the Baloncesto Superior Nacional league with 79 points.
 Marco Rivera, NFL football player, first Puerto Rican selected to Pro Bowl
 Ron Rivera, NFL football player, first Puerto Rican in the National Football League and to coach an NFL team
 Iván Rodríguez, former baseball player for the Texas Rangers. Inducted into the National Baseball Hall of Fame in 2017
 Rubén Rodríguez, basketball player
 José Roman, boxer, first Puerto Rican to fight for the world heavyweight title
 Francisco Rosa Rivera, "the trainer of stars"; personal trainer and self-made bodybuilding entrepreneur
 Edwin Rosario, boxer, former lightweight and junior welterweight champion; member of the International Boxing Hall of Fame (2006)
 Juan "Chi-Chi" Rodríguez, golfer, member of Golf Hall of Fame
 John Ruiz, a.k.a. "The Quietman", first Hispanic to become the heavyweight boxing champion of the world

S
 Natasha Sagardia, bodyboarding athlete; first Puerto Rican to win a gold medal at the ISA World Surfing Games
 Alex Sánchez a.k.a. "El Nene Sanchez", boxer, former champion
 Rey Sanchez, baseball player
 Benito Santiago, former MLB 1987 Rookie of the Year
 Daniel Santiago, former NBA basketball player
 O. J. Santiago, NFL player
 Samuel Serrano, boxer, former world champion
 Jessica Steffens, U.S. Olympic 2012 gold medal winner (Puerto Rican father)
 Margaret "Maggie" Steffens, U.S. Olympic 2012 gold medal winner; sister of Jessica Steffens

T
 Julio Toro, basketball coach
 Andrés Torres, baseball player, San Francisco Giants
 Georgie Torres, holds BSN scoring record
 José Torres, boxer, member of the International Boxing Hall of Fame
 Félix "Tito" Trinidad, boxer, former world champion. Member of the International Boxing Hall of Fame

V
 Lisa Marie Varon, WWE wrestler
 Jesse Vassallo, swimmer; current president of PR Swimming Federation; member of the International Swimming Hall of Fame
 Javier Vázquez, baseball player, active leader in strikeouts
 Wilfredo Vázquez, boxer, former champion
 Savio Vega, former WWF wrestler
 John Velazquez, jockey, member of Jockey Hall of Fame
 Ada Vélez, first Puerto Rican female boxer to win a championship
 Juan Evangelista Venegas, boxer; first Puerto Rican to win an Olympic medal
 Dick Versace, first person of Puerto Rican descent to coach an NBA team
 Juan "Pachín" Vicéns, basketball player, led the Ponce Lions team to six championships

W
 Mark Watring, equestrian
 Bernie Williams, baseball player, New York Yankees
 Mary Pat Wilson, Puerto Rico's first and only female Olympic skier; only woman in the Puerto Rican Ski Team in the 1988 Winter Olympics

Taínos

 Agüeybaná (Great Sun), Supreme Taíno chief, Supreme Cacique of Puerto Rico who welcomed Juan Ponce de León to the island; based in Guayanilla
 Agüeybaná II (The Brave), cacique and brother of Agueybaná; led the Taíno rebellion of 1511 against Juan Ponce de León and his men; based in Guayanilla
 Arasibo, cacique, area of Arecibo
 Caguax, cacique, area of Caguas
 Guarionex, cacique, area of Utuado
 Hayuya, cacique, area of Jayuya
 Jumacao, cacique, area of Humacao
 Orocobix, cacique, area of Orocovis
 Urayoán, cacique, area that presently spans between Añasco and Mayagüez; ordered the drowning of Diego Salcedo

Visual artists
 
 Alfonso Arana, painter, founder of the Fundación Alfonso Arana
 Imna Arroyo, artist
 Myrna Báez, painter and printmaker
 Jean-Michel Basquiat, painter (Puerto Rican mother)
 Tomás Batista, sculptor of "El Jibaro Puertorriqueño" monument and Zeno Gandía statue
 Isabel Bernal, painter from San Sebastian
 Ángel Botello, painter and sculptor
 Antonio Broccoli Porto, painter and sculptor from San Juan
 José Buscaglia Guillermety, sculptor
 Luis Germán Cajiga, painter most known for his silk screening technique
 Javier Cambre, sculptor, photographer, video artist
 José Campeche, artist
 José Caraballo, artist; President of Hispanic Art League, 1979
 Lindsay Daen, New Zealand-born artist; sculptor of La Rogativa statue in San Juan
 Jan D'Esopo, painter and sculptor
 Elizam Escobar, painter and activist
 James De La Vega, mural artist
 Ramón Frade, artist and architect
 Obed Gómez, contemporary artist known as the "Puerto Rican Picasso"
 Vilma G. Holland, painter
 Lorenzo Homar, graphic artist
 Antonio López, fashion illustrator
 Teresa López (born 1957), artist, graphic designer and art professor
 Daniel Lind-Ramos (born 1953), conceptual sculptor and painter
 Roberto Lugo, Visual Artist,
 Soraida Martinez, contemporary painter known for creating socially conscious Verdadism art since 1992
 Antonio Martorell, painter and graphic artist
 Ralph Ortiz, visual artist and founder of the El Museo del Barrio
 Francisco Oller, impressionist artist and painter
 María de Mater O'Neill, painter, educator, and graphic artist
 María Luisa Penne, painter, educator, and graphic artist
 Manuel Rivera-Ortiz, photographer
 Arnaldo Roche Rabell (1955–2018), painter
 Julio Rosado del Valle, internationally known abstract expressionist
 Samuel E Vázquez, abstract expressionist painter
 Miriam Zamparelli, sculptor

Miscellaneous

 Reynold Alexander, illusionist, magician
 Arthur Aviles, dancer and choreographer
 Jose Baez, criminal defense attorney; notable for his defense of accused child murderer Casey Anthony
 Marie Haydée Beltrán Torres, nationalist, convicted for a bombing in Manhattan 
 Felipe Birriel, "El Gigante de Carolina", the tallest Puerto Rican
 David Blaine, illusionist, magician (Puerto Rican father)
 Miguel de Buría , slave, known as King Miguel I de Buría
 Elisa Colberg, founder of the Puerto Rican Girl Scouts
 Inez García, cause celebre of the feminist movement
 Juan Manuel García Passalacqua, political commentator, lawyer
 Félix Rigau Carrera,  first Puerto Rican pilot; first pilot to fly on air mail carrying duties in Puerto Rico
 Crazy Legs, breakdancer, president of Rock Steady Crew
 Michael Ommy , Social Impact, Founder of Talent4Change, Inc. Founder of The Talent Catalog
 Clara Livingston, Puerto Rico's first female aviator
 Salixto Medina, lawyer, assistant U.S. attorney
 Emiliano Mercado del Toro, World's oldest living person from December 11, 2006 – January 24, 2007; oldest verified military veteran and Puerto Rican ever
 Filiberto Ojeda Ríos, commander in chief ("Responsible General") of the Boricua Popular Army
 Richard Peña, organizer of New York Film Festival; professor of film studies at Columbia University
 Tina Ramirez, dancer and choreographer born in Venezuela, best known as the Founder and Artistic Director of Ballet Hispanico of New York
 José Rodríguez, head of CIA division (2004–2008)
 Antulio "Kobbo" Santarrosa, "La Cháchara", "La Condesa", "La Comay"
 Jock Soto, principal ballet dancer with the New York City Ballet
 Filipo Tirado, puppeteer
 Carlos Alberto Torres, nationalist and former political prisoner

Gallery

See also

 Military history of Puerto Rico
 Lists of people by nationality
 List of Stateside Puerto Ricans
 List of Puerto Rican military personnel
 List of Puerto Ricans in the United States Space Program
 List of Puerto Ricans of African descent
 List of Major League Baseball players from Puerto Rico
 List of Puerto Rican boxing world champions
 List of Puerto Rican scientists and inventors
 List of Puerto Rican Presidential Medal of Freedom recipients
 List of Puerto Rican Presidential Citizens Medal recipients
 History of women in Puerto Rico
 List of People from Ponce, Puerto Rico
 Cultural diversity in Puerto Rico
 Chinese immigration to Puerto Rico
 Corsican immigration to Puerto Rico
 French immigration to Puerto Rico
 German immigration to Puerto Rico
 Irish immigration to Puerto Rico
 Jewish immigration to Puerto Rico

References

Bibliography
 . (JSTOR subscription required to access article online.)